= The Righteous Mind =

2012 book by Jonathan Haidt

The Righteous Mind: Why Good People are Divided by Politics and Religion
- First edition (US)
- Author: Jonathan Haidt
- Language: English
- Subject: Social psychology, evolutionary psychology, political psychology, moral psychology
- Published: 2012
- Publisher: Pantheon Books
- Publication place: United States
- Media type: Print (Hardcover and Paperback)
- Pages: 419
- ISBN: 978-0307377906
- OCLC: 713188806
- Website: righteousmind.com

A simple graphic as in the book depicting survey data from the United States intended to support moral foundations theory

The Righteous Mind: Why Good People are Divided by Politics and Religion is a 2012 social psychology book by Jonathan Haidt, in which the author describes human morality as it relates to politics and religion.

In the first section, Haidt demonstrates that people's beliefs are driven primarily by intuition, with reason operating mostly to justify beliefs that are intuitively obvious. In the second section, he lays out his theory that the human brain is organized to respond to several distinct types of moral violations, much like a tongue is organized to respond to different sorts of foods. In the last section, Haidt proposes that humans have an innate capacity to sometimes be "groupish" rather than "selfish".

== Summary ==
In the first part of the book, Jonathan Haidt uses cross-sectional research to demonstrate social intuitionism, how people's beliefs come primarily from their intuitions, and rational thought often comes after to justify initial beliefs. He cites David Hume and E. O. Wilson as thinkers who gave reason a relatively low estimation, as opposed to more popular thinkers who give reason a central place in moral cognition, such as Lawrence Kohlberg and his stages of moral reasoning.

In the second portion of the book, he presents moral foundations theory, and applies it to the political beliefs of liberals, conservatives, and libertarians in the US. Haidt argues that people are too quick to denigrate other points of view without giving those views full consideration, and attempts to reach common ground between liberals and conservatives. He makes the case in the book for morality having multiple foundations (more than just harm and fairness), and said in an interview that morality "is at least six things, and probably a lot more than that" and "[religion and politics are] ... expressions of our tribal, groupish, righteous nature." In his book, he compares the six aspects that people use to establish morality and take into consideration when making judgment to six taste receptors in the mouth. These aspects of morality are defined as care/harm, fairness/cheating, loyalty/betrayal, authority/subversion, sanctity/degradation, and liberty/oppression. He goes on to establish that Republicans and Democrats tend to focus on different morality receptors and this leads to worse political tactics and decision making. Haidt himself acknowledges that while he has been a liberal all his life, he is now more open to other points of view.

In the third part of the book, Haidt describes a hypothetical "hive switch", which turns a selfish human "chimp" into a "groupish" human "bee". He describes how cultures and organizations have techniques for getting people to identify with their groups, such as dancing, moving, and singing in unison.

== Key concepts and scholars discussed ==
- "Rationalist delusion": One of the key metaphors of the book is the "Rider and the Elephant", meant to describe the role of the rational mind in explaining/defending the unconscious mind's decision. The unconscious mind's elephant in fact determines the direction, but the rational mind's rider thinks it is in charge, and develops explanations for the decision that it has not made.
- Social intuitionism
- Moral foundations theory, a theory whose development Haidt had himself significantly contributed to
- Jean Piaget and developmental psychology
- Moral development and works by:
  - Lawrence Kohlberg
  - Elliot Turiel
- Richard Shweder on cultural anthropology
- Humean philosophy
- Platonic philosophy
  - Glaucon and the Ring of Gyges
- Steven Pinker on human nature (The Blank Slate)
- E.O. Wilson:
  - Consilience
  - Sociobiology: The New Synthesis
- Antonio Damasio and Descartes' Error
- Howard Margolis on psychology
- Philip E. Tetlock on accountability
- Dan Ariely on Predictably Irrational
- Dan P. McAdams on personalities
- Émile Durkheim on sociology
- Charles Darwin on group selection
- Religion
  - critiques by Richard Dawkins and Daniel Dennett
  - David Sloan Wilson and Darwin's Cathedral
- Barbara Ehrenreich and Dancing in the Streets

== Reception ==
The book was #6 on The New York Times Best Seller list for non-fiction in April 2012.

=== Journalistic reception ===
William Saletan wrote in The New York Times in 2012 that the book is "a landmark contribution to humanity’s understanding of itself".

The book received two reviews in The Guardian: in 2012, Ian Birrell called the book a "compelling study of the morality of those on the left and right [that] reaches some surprising conclusions"; and in 2013 Nicholas Lezard wrote that he was "in the odd position of being wary of a book I am also recommending. It's entertaining, snappily written and thought-provoking. It might even help Labour win the next election. But it still doesn't explain the gang running the country at the moment [the UK Conservative Party]."

Journalist Chris Hedges, reviewing The Righteous Mind in 2012, wrote that Haidt "repeatedly reduces social, historical, moral and political complexities to easily digestible clichés." He also observed blinkeredness in Haidt, writing that Haidt's praise for "what he believes are military virtues" (quoting Haidt's praise of military heroism which "sacralizes honor, loyalty, and country") shows that "he has never been on a battlefield", and that Haidt "makes no effort to explore the lives of the underclass" in Bhubaneswar while enjoying Bhubaneswar servants' service of him. Hedges wrote, "[W]hile Haidt correctly excoriates conventional morality as largely a form of self-justification, his solution is not to seek a moral code that benefits our neighbor but to ask us to surrender to this self-interest and become part of human “hives,”". He argued that "Haidt recognizes these [...] passions," but in response to that, "he encourages us to give in to them." Hedges argued that "Haidt mistakes the immoral as moral. [...] This is a book that, perhaps unwittingly, sanctifies obedience to the corporate state and totalitarian power. It puts forth an argument that obliterates the possibility of the moral life."

=== Academic reviews ===
- Blum, Lawrence (September 2013). "Political identity and moral education: A response to Jonathan Haidt's The Righteous Mind". Journal of Moral Education. 42 (3): 298–315. doi:10.1080/03057240.2013.817331.
- Guthrie, Clifton F. (2013). "The Righteous Mind: Why Good People are Divided by Politics and Religion by Jonathan Haidt". Teaching Ethics. 13 (2): 167–170. doi:10.5840/tej201313212.
- Jost, John T. (3 August 2012). "Left and Right, Right and Wrong The Righteous Mind Why Good People Are Divided by Politics and Religion by Jonathan Haidt Pantheon, New York, 2012. 441 pp. $28.95, C$33. ISBN 9780307377906. Allen Lane, London. £20. ISBN 9781846141812". Science. 337 (6094): 525–526. doi:10.1126/science.1222565.
- LaFollette, Hugh; Woodruff, Michael L. (13 September 2013). "The Righteous Mind: Why Good People Are Divided by Politics and Religion". Philosophical Psychology. 28 (3): 452–465. doi:10.1080/09515089.2013.838752.
- Miller, Dale E. (14 January 2014). "Jonathan Haidt, The Righteous Mind: Why Good People are Divided by Politics and Religion (New York: Pantheon, 2012), pp. xvii + 419". Utilitas. 26 (1): 124–127. doi:10.1017/S0953820813000253.
- Vaisey, Stephen (11 January 2013). "The Righteous Mind – About Jonathan Haidt, The Righteous Mind". European Journal of Sociology. 53 (3): 448–451. doi:10.1017/S0003975612000422.

== See also ==
- Big Five personality traits
- Ethical subjectivism
- Evolutionary psychology
- Moral foundations theory
- Moral psychology
- Moral relativism
