= Haidt =

Haidt is a surname. Notable people with the surname include:

- John Valentine Haidt (1700–1780), German-born American painter and preacher
- Jonathan Haidt (born 1963), American social psychologist and author
- Dieter Haidt (born 1940), German physicist

== See also ==
- Heidt (surname)
- Haight (disambiguation)
