= Foundations of Morality =

Foundations of Morality can refer to:

- The Foundations of Morality, a 1964 book by Henry Hazlitt
- Moral foundations theory
