= Political ethics =

Practice of making moral judgments about political action and political agents

Political ethics (also known as political morality or public ethics) is the practice of making moral judgments about political action and political agents. It covers two areas: the ethics of process (or the ethics of office), which covers public officials and their methods, and the ethics of policy (or ethics and public policy), which concerns judgments surrounding policies and laws.

The core values and expectations of political morality have historically derived from the principles of justice. However, John Rawls defends the theory that the political concept of justice is ultimately based on the common good of the individual rather than on the values one is expected to follow.

While trying to make moral judgments about political issues, people tend to leverage their own perceived definition of morality. The concept of morality itself derives from several moral foundations. Morality, seen through the lens of these foundations, shapes peoples' judgments about political actions and agents.

== Ethics of process ==
Niccolò Machiavelli is one of the most famous political theorists who spoke on, and later subverted, the matters of political ethics. Unlike Aristotle, he believed that a political leader may be required to behave in evil ways if necessary to maintain his authority.

In contemporary democracies, a variant of this idea has been reframed as the problem of dirty hands, described most influentially by Michael Walzer, who argues that the problem creates a paradox; the politician must sometimes "do wrong to do right". Some critics object that Walzer's view is justified. Dennis Thompson has argued that in a democracy, unjust acts by a leader would be the fault of both the leader and the citizens because they did not hold their leader responsible.

In large organizations, it is often impossible to tell which party is responsible for the outcomes—a phenomenon known as the problem of many hands.

Political ethics requires leaders to meet higher standards than would be necessary for private life. They may have less of a right to privacy than ordinary citizens do, or no right to use their office for personal profit. Personal morality and political morality are often viewed as a conflict of interest. Both individuals in the political domain as an authority and as active civic participants can have these values bleed through to the personal sector of morality. An individual who learned the skills necessary in the political sector may apply these learned qualities in a setting outside of politics, often viewed as a private everyday setting. In contrast, one who is entering the political setting may have already held the qualities and virtues that are expected in the professional setting. The values already held by individuals will then be applied to the new political setting. Those who have emerged into the political sphere can benefit from knowing that virtues and morals can be influential prior to entering.

== Ethics of policy ==
Personal morality is also factored into public morality. Given the democratic republic present in the United States, public morality is often referred to as 'formal'. Abiding by the order of law, in addition to maintaining respect, are two critical factors in order to achieve the concept of public morality. These elements are expected when an individual is actively participating in the political sphere and are required for the behavior of political authorities. Each citizen has their own belief and morals toward every topic, but it is the political authorities' duty to respect others' beliefs and advocate for the beliefs of their constituents while following the law and constitution.

In the other area of political ethics, the key issues are not the conflict between means and ends, but the conflicts among the ends themselves. In the question of global justice, the conflict is between the claims of the nation-state and its citizens. Traditionally, priority has been given to the claims of nations, but in recent years, thinkers known as cosmopolitans have pressed the claims of all citizens of the world.

Political ethics deals with realizing moral values in democratic societies where citizens (and philosophers) disagree about what ideal justice is. In a pluralist society, governments attempt to justify policies such as progressive taxation, affirmative action, the right to abortion, and universal healthcare. Political ethics is also concerned with moral problems raised by the need for political compromise, whistleblowing, civil disobedience, and criminal punishment.

== Foundations of (political) morality ==
According to Graham et al. (2009), there are two broad classes of moral foundations: individualizing foundations and binding foundations.

=== Individualizing foundations ===
The two individualizing foundations of morality are the fairness/reciprocity foundation (ethic of justice) and the harm/care foundation (ethic of care). The fairness/reciprocity foundation represents a person's desire for fairness and reciprocity. The harm/care foundation concerns the caring attitude of a person towards another.

=== Binding foundations ===
The three binding foundations are in-group/loyalty, authority/respect, and purity/sanctity. The first two correspond to the ethics of community, and represent a person's belonging and attachment to a group dynamic. It is concerned with feelings like patriotism, obedience, etc. The last foundation corresponds to the ethic of divinity and represents a person's desire to suppress or control humanity's nature of lust, selfishness, etc. (usually via spirituality).

== Moral foundations, political identity, and moral political judgments ==
Graham et al. (2009) conducted a study to determine whether moral judgments about politics are affected by explicit or implicit political identities. Explicit political identity is the identity supplied by the study participant explicitly during the study. Implicit political identity is the participant's identity determined by the scientists based on an IAT test. For both explicitly and implicitly supplied identities, they found that liberals gave more weightage to the individualizing foundations than the binding foundations, while making a moral judgment regarding political issues. On the other hand, the conservatives seemed to give an approximately equal weightage to both classes of foundations. However, they note that this distinction is not necessarily true across time and space.

== Criticisms ==
Some critics (termed political realists) argue that ethics has no place in politics. If politicians are to be effective in the real world, they cannot be bound by moral rules and must pursue the national interest. However, Walzer points out that if the realists are asked to justify their claims, they will almost always appeal to moral principles of their own (for example, to show that ethics is harmful or counterproductive).

Another kind of criticism comes from those who argue that citizens should not pay so much attention to politicians and policies but should instead look more closely at the larger structures of society where the most serious ethical problems lie. Advocates of political ethics respond that while structural injustice should not be ignored, too much emphasis on structures neglects the human agents who are responsible for changing them.

== See also ==
- Legal ethics
- Moral authority
- Natural and legal rights
- Political philosophy
- Political theology
- Statism
- Moral foundations theory
