= Edward Haigh =

Edward Haigh may refer to:

- Ed Haigh (1867–1953), American baseball player
- Eddie Haigh (1935–2016), British trade unionist

== See also ==
- Edward Haight (disambiguation)
