= Dan P. McAdams =

American personality psychologist

- Born: February 7, 1954 (age 72); Lynwood, California, U.S.
- Education: Valparaiso University; Harvard University
- Scientific career
- Fields: Narrative psychology and Thematic coherence
- Workplaces: Northwestern University (professor)

Dan P. McAdams (born February 7, 1954) is an American psychologist and the Henry Wade Rogers Professor in the Department of Psychology at Northwestern University.

== Biography ==
He was raised in Gary, Indiana, where he attended nearby Valparaiso University. In 1979, he was awarded a Ph.D. from the Harvard Department of Social Relations.

McAdams is the author of The Person: An Introduction to the Science of Personality Psychology, a classroom textbook. He co-edited, with Amia Lieblich and Ruthellen Josselson, the eleven-book series "The Narrative Study of Lives". He is a member of The Human Capital and Economic Opportunity Working Group at the Becker Friedman Institute for Research in Economics.

== Three Levels of Personality ==
McAdams's three-level model of personality was used in Jonathan Haidt's The Happiness Hypothesis The three levels are :

1. Dispositional traits, a person's general tendencies. For example, the Big Five personality traits lists: Openness, Conscientiousness, Extraversion, Agreeableness, Neuroticism.
2. Characteristic adaptations, a person's desires, beliefs, concerns, and coping mechanisms.
3. Life stories, the stories that give a life a sense of unity, meaning, and purpose. This is known as narrative identity.

== Publication ==
=== Bibliography ===
Selected publications:

- McAdams, D. P. (2015). "The art and science of personality development" New York: The Guilford Press
- McAdams, D. P. (2011). "George W. Bush and the redemptive dream: A psychological portrait." New York: Oxford University Press.
- McAdams, D. P., & Olson, B. (2010). "Personality development: Continuity and change over the life course." In S. Fiske, D. Schacter, and R. Sternberg (Eds.), Annual Review of Psychology (Vol. 61, pp. 517–542). Palo Alto, CA: Annual Reviews, Inc.
- Bauer, J. J., & McAdams, D. P. (2010). "Eudaimonic growth: Narrative growth goals predict increases in ego development and subjective well-being 3 years later." Developmental Psychology, 46, 761–772.
- McAdams, D. P. (2009). "The person: An introduction to the science of personality psychology" (5th Ed.). New York: Wiley.
- McAdams, Dan P. (2008). Foreword to Explorations in Personality, by Henry A. Murray. New York: Oxford University Press.
- McAdams, D. P., Albaugh, M., Farber, E., Daniels, J., Logan, R. L., & Olson, B. (2008). "Family metaphors and moral intuitions: How conservatives and liberals narrate their lives." Journal of Personality and Social Psychology, 95, 978–990.
- McAdams, D. P., & Pals, J. L. (2006). "A new Big Five: Fundamental principles for an integrative science of personality." American Psychologist, 61, 204–217.
- McAdams, D. P. (2006). "The redemptive self: Stories Americans live by." New York: Oxford University Press.
- McAdams, D. P., Josselson, R. & Lieblich, A. (2001). "Turns in the road : narrative studies of lives in transition" Washington, DC : American Psychological Association.
- McAdams, Dan P (2020). The Strange Case of Donald J. Trump: A Psychological Reckoning. Oxford University Press. ISBN 978-0197507476.

=== Articles and essays ===
- McAdams, D. P., & Guo, J. (2015). Narrating the generative life. Psychological Science, 26, 475–483.
- Manczak, E., Zapata-Gietl, C., & McAdams, D. P. (2014). Regulatory focus in the life story: Prevention and promotion as expressed in three layers of personality. Journal of Personality and Social Psychology, 106, 169–181.
- McAdams, D. P. (2013). The psychological self as actor, agent, and author. Perspectives on Psychological Science, 8, 272–295.
- McAdams, D.P. (1995). What do we know when we know a person? Journal of Personality. 63:3, 365 - 396. Duke University Press.
- McAdams, D. P. (1996). Personality, Modernity, and the storied self: A contemporary framework for studying persons. Psychological Inquiry, 7(4), 295–321.
