= Michelle Kosch =

American philosopher

- Born: 1965 (age 60–61)
- Awards: DAAD fellowship

Education
- Education: Harvard University (BA, 1990); Columbia University (PhD, 1999)

Philosophical work
- Era: 21st-century philosophy
- Region: Western philosophy
- School: Continental philosophy
- Institutions: Cornell University; New York University
- Main interests: Moral psychology

Michelle Kosch (born 1965) is an American philosopher and Professor of Philosophy at New York University. She is known for her works on nineteenth and twentieth century continental philosophy.

== Books ==
- Freedom and Reason in Kant, Schelling, and Kierkegaard, Oxford University Press, 2006.
- Fichte’s Ethics, Oxford University Press, 2018.
