= Thomas Nadelhoffer =

American philosopher

Education
- Education: University of Georgia (BA), Georgia State University (MA), Florida State University (PhD)

Philosophical work
- Era: 21st-century philosophy
- Region: Western philosophy
- Institutions: College of Charleston
- Main interests: moral psychology, philosophy of law, philosophy of mind
- Website: http://www.thomasnadelhoffer.com/

Thomas Nadelhoffer is an American philosopher and Professor at the College of Charleston. He is known for his works on moral psychology, philosophy of law and philosophy of mind.

== Edited books ==
- Nadelhoffer, T., & Monroe, A. (2022). Advances in experimental philosophy of free will and responsibility. New York: Bloomsbury Academic.
- Vincent, N., Nadelhoffer, T., & McCay, A. (2020). Neurointerventions and the law: Regulating human mental capacity. New York: Oxford University Press.
- Nadelhoffer, T. (2013). The future of punishment. New York: Oxford University Press.
- Nadelhoffer, T., Nahmias, E., & Nichols, S. (2010). Moral psychology: Classical and contemporary readings. Malden, MA: Wiley-Blackwell.
