= The Happiness Hypothesis =

2006 book by Jonathan Haidt

- Author: Jonathan Haidt
- Genre: Psychology
- Publisher: Basic Books
- Publication date: 2006
- Pages: 320
- ISBN: 978-0-465-02802-3
- Followed by: The Righteous Mind

The Happiness Hypothesis: Finding Modern Truth in Ancient Wisdom is a 2006 book written by American social psychologist Jonathan Haidt. In it, Haidt poses several "Great Ideas" on happiness espoused by thinkers of the past—such as Plato, Buddha and Jesus—and examines them in the light of contemporary psychological research, extracting from them any lessons that still apply to our modern lives. Central to the book are the concepts of virtue, happiness, fulfillment, and meaning.

== Summary of chapters ==
The introduction first explains that the author's goal is to reduce the infinite 'wisdom' accessible to modern people into 10 great ideas, one per chapter. The remainder of the Introduction provides a concise preview of those ten chapters as follows.

The first chapter describes how each person has two parts: the primitive part, which includes our basic instincts; and the highly evolved part, which tries to control the instincts. This effort to control our instincts is shown in chapter two to tend to cause us too much worry, but various techniques, such as meditation, might be employed to detach the worrier from his worries. The third chapter goes to the relationship of the individual to other individuals by beginning with the Golden Rule of doing unto others as you would have them do unto you. This leads in the fourth chapter to a description of the tendency that people have of seeing faults in others more readily than in themselves, which by simply realizing we might go to some length to rectify and thus come closer to living by the Golden Rule.

By the fifth chapter, at the halfway point of the book, Haidt introduces the notion of the Happiness Hypothesis. The Happiness Hypothesis could be that happiness comes from within, as Buddha said, or could be that happiness comes from outside. Haidt argues in Chapter Six that the truth might lie between the two extremes and contends that love depends on more than the self and is crucial to happiness. The seventh chapter asks whether adversity is essential to happiness and provides a nuanced answer which is that it depends on your stage in life. Achieving happiness is a complex process which includes acting virtuously, and Haidt claims in chapter eight that behaving virtuously means to do as Aristotle said and to develop your strengths and realize your native potential. Chapter nine extends the idea that a person's happiness benefits from living virtuously by noting that some feeling of divinity helps where divinity comes through a life-long practice of moral actions. Chapter ten takes this idea of a life-long practice yet further and contends that a happy life is one where you get the relationships right between yourself and others, yourself and your work, and between your work and something larger than yourself—you feel a sense of purpose.

=== Ch.1: The divided self ===
Haidt looks at a number of ways of dividing the self that have existed since ancient times:

- mind vs. body
- left brain vs. right brain (lateralisation of brain function)
- old brain vs. new brain (frontal cortex)
- controlled vs. automatic

Haidt focuses on this last division, between the conscious/reasoned processes and automatic/implicit processes. His metaphor is a rider on the back of an elephant in which the conscious mind is the rider and the unconscious mind is the elephant. The rider is unable to control the elephant by force: this explains many puzzles about our mental life, particularly why we have such trouble with weakness of will. Learning how to train the elephant is the secret of self-improvement.

=== Ch.2: Changing your mind ===
The automatic emotional reactions of the "elephant" (affective priming) guide us throughout our lives. People even tend to choose mates, and professions, whose names resemble their own. Though there is a bias towards negativity, some people are optimists and others pessimists. Haidt discusses three ways of changing those automatic reactions: (1) meditation, (2) cognitive therapy, and (3) SSRI medications such as Prozac.

=== Ch.3: Reciprocity with a vengeance ===
Many species have a social life, but among mammals, only humans in particular are ultra-social—able to live in very large cooperative groups. The Golden Rule, supplemented with gossip, is the secret of our success. Calling on Robert Cialdini's "six weapons of influence," Haidt describes ways in which understanding the deep workings of reciprocity can help to solve problems in our social lives and guard against the many ways that we can be manipulated.

=== Ch.4: The faults of others ===
Part of our ultra-sociality is that we are constantly trying to manipulate others' perceptions of ourselves, without realizing that we are doing so.

Haidt looks at what social psychology has to say about this, beginning with the work of Daniel Batson on cheating and self-justification, mentioning Robert Wright's description of our "constitutional ignorance" of hypocrisy in The Moral Animal, and moving on to work by Deanna Kuhn and David Perkins on confirmation bias and Roy Baumeister's work on "The Myth of Pure Evil." Haidt then discusses ways of taking off "the moral glasses" and seeing the world as it really is.

=== Ch.5: The pursuit of happiness ===
It is a common idea that happiness comes from within and can't be found in external things. For a while in the 1990s, psychologists agreed with ancient sages (such as Buddha and Epictetus) that external conditions are not what matter. However, Haidt argues that we now know that some external circumstances do matter. He identifies ways of improving happiness by altering these, including being smart with money, and argues that the Western emphasis on action and striving has merit.

=== Ch.6: Love and attachments ===
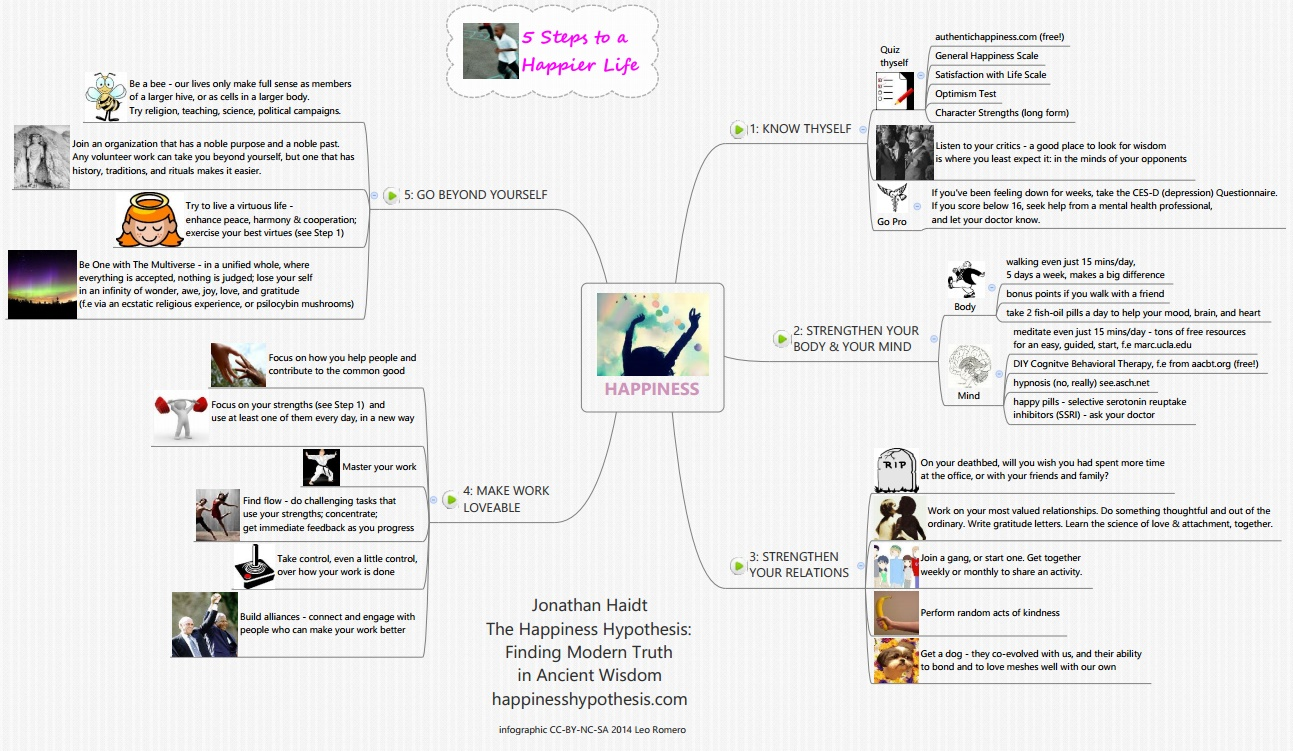
5 Steps to a Happier Life: infographic based on The Happiness Hypothesis

There are many kinds of love, but, Haidt asserts, they all begin to make sense when you see where love comes from, and what it does. To do this he examines John Bowlby's World Health Organization-sponsored study and report, "Maternal Care and Mental Health" in 1950, and the subsequent work with monkeys by Harry Harlow. Understanding the different kinds of love, he writes, can help explain why people make so many mistakes with love, and why philosophers hate love and give us bad advice about it.

=== Ch.7: The uses of adversity ===
Nietzsche wrote, "What doesn't kill me makes me stronger," but this is not true for everyone; adversity can result in post-traumatic stress disorder. Haidt discusses how and why some people grow from their suffering, along with ways of improving one's chances of finding post-traumatic growth. Adversity, as Robert Sternberg's research on wisdom shows, can make people more compassionate and better able to balance the needs of self and others.

=== Ch.8: The felicity of virtue ===
Giving Benjamin Franklin as an example, Haidt looks at how success can follow virtue, in the broad sense of virtue that comes from the Ancient Greek arete, excellence. The ancients, according to Haidt, had a sophisticated psychological understanding of virtue, using maxims, fables and role-models to train "the elephant," the automatic responses of the individual. Though the beginnings of Western virtue lie in Homer, Aesop and the Old Testament, the modern understanding of it has much to do with the arguments of Kant (the categorical imperative) and Bentham (utilitarianism). With these came a shift from character ethics to quandary ethics, from moral education to moral reasoning.

To address the question of how a common morality can be forged in a diverse society, Haidt turns to positive psychology, specifically to Seligman and Peterson's work on virtues and strengths.

=== Ch.9: Divinity with or without God ===
Using the metaphor of Flatland, Haidt argues that the perception of sacredness and divinity are two basic features of the human mind; the emotions of disgust, moral elevation, and awe tell us about this dimension. The "religious right" can only be understood by acknowledging this dimension, which most liberals and secular thinkers ignore or misunderstand. The work of William James and of Abraham Maslow (on "peak experiences") shows ways in which this dimension is also relevant to the non-religious.

=== Ch.10: Happiness comes from between ===
Haidt discusses "the meaning of life," making the distinction between a purpose for life and a purpose within life. Love and work give a sense of meaning to life. A study by Mihaly Csikszentmihalyi, Howard Gardner and William Damon established the concept of "vital engagement" which characterises work with the most sense of purpose. "Cross-level coherence" within one's self and life is also vital, coherence between the physical, psychological and sociocultural levels. Haidt argues that religion is an evolved mechanism for creating this coherence.

=== Ch.11: On balance ===
Haidt concludes by arguing that the ancient idea of Yin and Yang turns out to be the wisest idea of all. We need, he writes, the perspectives of ancient religion and modern science; of east and west; even of liberal and conservative. "Words of wisdom really do flood over us, but only by drawing from many sources can we become wise."

== Reception ==
The Happiness Hypothesis received positive reviews. Daniel Nettle, reviewing the book in Nature, accepted its central premise of a "striking similarity between the advice of the ancients on how to live, and the thoughts of modern psychologists on how to have a healthy mind." He was impressed by the breadth of Haidt's grasp of modern behavioural science, and found the book "by some margin the most intellectually substantial book to arise from the 'positive psychology' movement."

James Flint concluded his review of the book in The Guardian saying, "I don't think I've ever read a book that laid out the contemporary understanding of the human condition with such simple clarity and sense." Christopher Hart writing in The Times described the book as "humane, witty and comforting...brilliantly synthesising ancient cultural insights with modern psychology."

== See also ==
- Happiness
- Positive psychology
