= Candice Odgers =

Canadian psychologist

- Born: 1976 (age 49–50)
- Occupations: Director of Research and Faculty Development; Professor, Psychological Science and Informatics

Academic background
- Education: Simon Fraser University (BA, MA); University of Virginia (PhD)

Academic work
- Discipline: Psychological sciences
- Sub-discipline: quantitative psychology, developmental psychology, informatics
- Institutions: School of Social Ecology, University of California, Irvine; Social Science Research Institute, Duke University

Candice Lynn Odgers (born 1976) is a Canadian developmental and quantitative psychologist with expertise in influences adolescent mental health. Odgers currently serves as the associate dean for research and faculty development at the School of Social Ecology at the University of California, Irvine (UCI), where she has been a professor of psychological science since 2016. and a research professor at Duke University. Odgers is also the co-director of the Child and Brain Development Program at the Canadian Institute for Advanced Research and runs the Adaptlab at UCI. In 2025, she was named the chancellor's professor in the department of psychological science at UCI.

== Biography ==
Odgers played college basketball and attended Simon Fraser University (SFU), where she received her undergraduate degree in Criminology and Psychology. Her brother is Jeff Odgers, a professional ice hockey player formerly in the National Hockey League (NHL).

Odgers obtained a Masters level degree from SFU in 2001 and was awarded with the Terry Fox Medal for overcoming adversity following a serious motor vehicle accident while traveling with the Women's Basketball Team at SFU. Odgers was awarded a Commonwealth Fellowship to continue her studies at Cambridge University, but declined the award to pursue a PhD in psychology at the University of Virginia.

After completing her PhD, Odgers trained at King's College in London, England. She was a postdoctoral research at the Social, Genetic, and Developmental Psychiatry Centre with Terrie Moffitt and Avshalom Caspi. In this capacity, she helped to create a 'genes-to-geography' data archive for 2,232 children from the Environmental-Risk Longitudinal Twin Study.

In 2007, Odgers began a faculty position at UCI. In 2012 she became the associate director at the Center for Child and Family Policy at Duke University and a professor of public policy, psychology and neuroscience. Odgers became a Fellow for the Association for Psychological Science in 2013, and a Fellow at the Child Brain & Development Program at the Canadian Institute for Advanced Research in 2016. She is currently the Chancellor's professor in the department of psychological studies at UCI and a visiting research fellow at Duke University.

As of 2026, Odgers has over 19,000 citations in her research. Since the mid 2010s, she has been active in contributing to non-academic publications on the effects of social media on childhood mental health.

== Research and policy stances on social media and mental health ==
Odgers is well known for her research on social media use and adolescent wellbeing. Odgers' research uses primarily mixed method research design, with an emphasis on ecological momentary analysis. Her beliefs are oppositional to Jonathan Haidt, who believes that children's use of social media is detrimental to their mental health. Her belief is that the findings of social media research indicate there is a weak, and therefore negligible relationship between social media use and health in adolescents. Odgers' research has identified that there is a wider set of causes, outside of social media use, on declining mental health of young people.

Odgers has received fellowship support for her research, including the 2014 William T. Grant Scholar Award and the 2016 Advanced Research Fellowship from Klaus J. Jacobs Foundation.

== Awards and honors ==
Odgers has been recognized through her research. This includes the 2015 Distinguished Contributions to Psychology in the Public Interest Early Career Award from the American Psychological Association, the 2012 Janet Taylor Spence Award from the Association for Psychological Science, and the 2005 Alice Wilson Award from the Royal Society of Canada.
