= Richard Shweder =

American anthropologist

Richard Allan Shweder (born 1945) is an American cultural anthropologist and a figure in cultural psychology. He is currently Harold H. Swift Distinguished Service Professor of Human Development in the Department of Comparative Human Development at the University of Chicago. He is the author of Thinking Through Cultures: Expeditions in Cultural Psychology (1991) and Why Do Men Barbecue? Recipes for Cultural Psychology (2003).

== Education and career ==
Shweder received his B.A. in anthropology from the University of Pittsburgh in 1966 and his Ph.D. in social anthropology from Harvard University's department of social relations in 1972. He taught at the University of Nairobi in Nairobi, Kenya, for one year. He has been a faculty member at the University of Chicago since 1973.

== Research ==
Shweder's main fieldwork outside the United States has been in the temple town of Bhubaneswar in the state of Orissa, India. Among other topics, his fieldwork in India has looked at cross-cultural concepts of the person, self, emotions, and moral reasoning. His work in moral psychology included proposing the Community / Autonomy / Divinity triad of moral concerns, a line of research continued by Shweder's former student Lene Arnett Jensen, and which also served as one of the inspirations for Moral Foundations Theory, proposed by two of Shweder's former students Jonathan Haidt and Craig Joseph.

He has also published extensively on matters relevant to the "culture wars" debates in cultural studies in the United States, and has advocated forms of cultural pluralism while being mindful of the practical and ethical difficulties certain kinds of pluralism entail. He chaired a joint Russell Sage Foundation / Social Science Research Council Working Group on "Ethnic Customs, Assimilation, and American Law" (renamed as, "Law and Culture"), concerned with the issue of the "Free exercise of culture: How Free Is It? How Free Ought It To Be?" He also has commented upon military uses of anthropology for counterinsurgency and other purposes outside of the United States.

He is a past president of the Society for Psychological Anthropology. Shweder was the winner of the 1982 AAAS Prize for Behavioral Science Research, and the recipient of academic awards and research grants.

== Selected publications ==
- Shweder, Richard A., and Robert A. Levine, editors. (1984) Culture Theory: Essays on Mind, Self and Emotion. New York: Cambridge University Press.
- Shweder, Richard A., and D.W. Fiske, editors. (1986) Metatheory in Social Science: Pluralisms and Subjectivities. Chicago: The University of Chicago Press.
- Richard A. Shweder (1988), "Suffering in Style", Culture, Medicine and Psychiatry, 12 (4), Review of Arthur Kleinman's (1986) book Social Origins of Distress and Disease: 479–497, doi:10.1007/BF00054499, S2CID 143493154 (See also chapter 8 in Thinking through cultures, which is substantially the same text with minor amendments).
- Shweder, Richard A (1991), Thinking through Cultures: Expeditions in Cultural Psychology, Cambridge, MA: Harvard University Press, ISBN 0-674-88416-7
- R A Shweder & M A Sullivan (January 1993), "Cultural Psychology: Who Needs It?", Annual Review of Psychology, 44: 497–523, doi:10.1146/annurev.ps.44.020193.002433
- Jessor, Richard, Anne Colby, and Richard Shweder, editors. (1996) Ethnography and Human Development: Context and Meaning in Social Inquiry. Chicago: The University of Chicago Press.
- Stigler, James; Richard A. Shweder; Gilbert Herdt, eds. (1999) [First published 1990], Cultural Psychology: Essays on comparative human development, Cambridge & New York: Cambridge University Press, ISBN 0-521-37804-4
- Richard A. Shweder & Jonathan Haidt (2000), "The Cultural Psychology of Emotions: Ancient and New" (PDF), in M. Lewis & J.M. Haviland-Jones (eds.), Handbook of Emotions (2nd ed.), New York: Guilford Press, pp. 379–414, archived from the original (PDF) on 2016-03-03
- Shweder, Richard A., Martha Minow, and Hazel Markus, editors. (2002) Engaging Cultural Differences: The Multicultural Challenge in Liberal Democracies. New York: Russell Sage Foundation Press.
- Shweder, Richard A., "Why do Men Barbecue?" (2002).
- Good, Byron; Richard Shweder, eds. (2005), Clifford Geertz by His Colleagues, Chicago: The University of Chicago Press, ISBN 0-226-75610-6
- Shweder, Richard A. 2007. “A True Culture War.” The New York Times 10/27/07.
- Shweder, Richard A., editor, (2009) The Child: An Encyclopedic Companion. Chicago: The University of Chicago Press
