= Heidt =

Heidt is a surname. Notable people with the surname include:

- Brad Heidt, Canadian curler
- Gary Heidt (born 1970), American conceptual artist
- Horace Heidt (1901–1986), American pianist, big band leader, and radio and television personality
- Winifred Heidt (1906-1990), American, Detroit based Opera Singer. Broadway Performer as Carmen in 1945. Performed on NBC Television Opera Theatre in 1949. Broadway Performer in Carousel as Mrs. Mullin in 1954.
- Mike Heidt (born 1963), German-Canadian ice hockey player
- Peter Heidt (born 1965), German politician

== See also ==
- Haidt (surname)
