= Haight =

Haight may refer to:

People with the surname Haight include:

- Albert Haight (1842–1926), American lawyer
- Charles C. Haight (1841–1917), American architect
- Charles S. Haight Jr. (born 1930), American lawyer, judge in the U.S. District Court for the Southern District of New York
- David B. Haight (1906–2004), American politician and religious leader
- Edward Haight, multiple people
- Elmer E. Haight (1861–1934), American politician
- Gordon S. Haight (1901–1985), American professor of English at Yale University
- Henry Haight (1820–1869), American exchange banker, uncle of Henry Huntly Haight
- Henry Huntly Haight (1825–1878), American politician, Governor of California
- Horton D. Haight (1832–1900), American Mormon pioneer
- Hunter Haight (born 2004), Canadian ice hockey player
- Jacob Haight (1775/6–c. 1860), American politician, New York State Treasurer 1839–1842
- J. Hayward Haight (1844–1909), American merchant
- Roger Haight (1936–2025), American Jesuit theologian
- Thomas Griffith Haight (1879–1942), American circuit judge in New Jersey
- Walter Haight (1899–1968), American sports writer

In places:

- Haight, Alberta, a community in Canada
- Haight Street, San Francisco
- Haight-Ashbury, a neighborhood in San Francisco famous for its connections to the 1960s counterculture
- Lower Haight, San Francisco
- Haight Township, Michigan
