= Jonathan Haidt =

American social psychologist (born 1963)

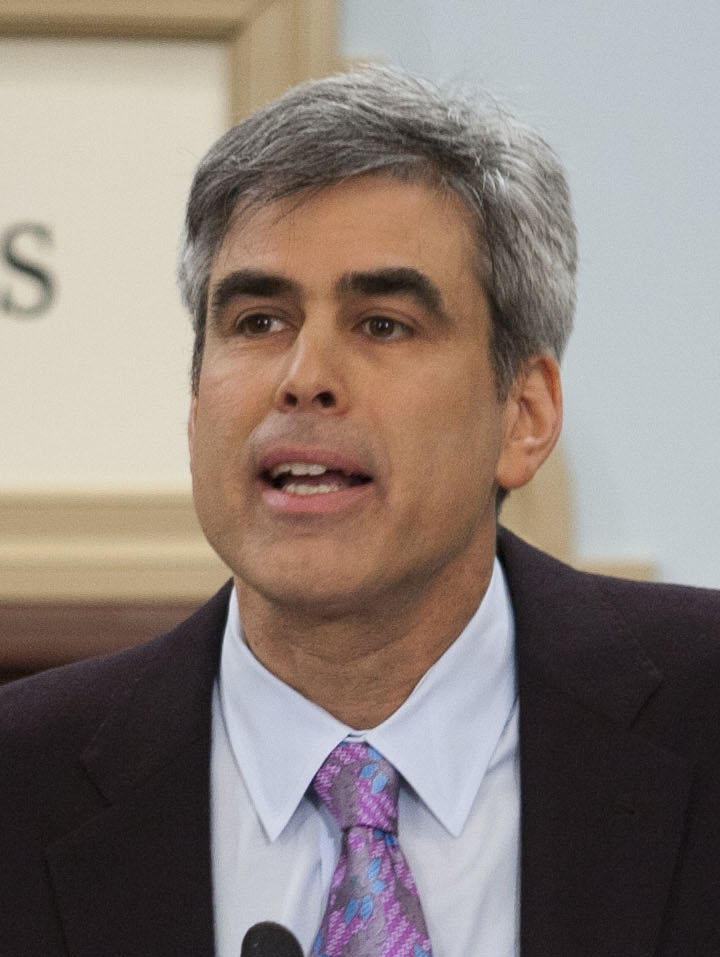
- Haidt in 2012
- Born: Jonathan David Haidt; October 19, 1963 (age 63); New York City, U.S.
- Education: Yale University (BA); University of Pennsylvania (MA, PhD)
- Known for: Moral foundations theory; Social intuitionism; Haidt's theories of elevation
- Notable work: The Happiness Hypothesis (2006); The Righteous Mind (2012); The Coddling of the American Mind (2018); The Anxious Generation (2024)
- Awards: Templeton Prize in Positive Psychology (2001); American Academy of Arts and Sciences (2019)
- Scientific career
- Fields: Social psychology Moral psychology
- Workplaces: University of Chicago; University of Virginia; New York University
- Thesis: Moral Judgment, Affect, and Culture: Or, Is It Wrong to Eat Your Dog? (1992)
- Doctoral advisor: Jonathan Baron; Alan Fiske
- Website: Official website

Jonathan David Haidt (/haɪt/ HYTE; born October 19, 1963) is an American social psychologist and author. He is a professor of business and society and the Thomas Cooley Chair in Ethical Leadership at the New York University Stern School of Business. Haidt's main areas of study are the psychology of morality and moral emotions.

Haidt's main contributions to the field of psychology come from his theory of moral foundations, which attempts to explain the origins of human moral reasoning on the basis of innate "modules", resulting from biological and cultural evolution. The theory was later further developed to explain variation in moral reasoning as it relates to political ideology, positing that people arrive at different political orientations due to prioritizing different sets of morals. Haidt's current research applies moral psychology to business ethics.

Haidt has written multiple popular psychology books, including The Happiness Hypothesis (2006) examining the relationship between ancient philosophies and modern science, The Righteous Mind (2012) on moral politics, and The Coddling of the American Mind (2018) on rising political polarization, mental health, and college culture. In 2024, he published The Anxious Generation, arguing that the rise of smartphones and overprotective parenting has led to a "rewiring" of childhood and increased mental illness. Some of his conclusions and methodologies are controversial.

== Biography ==
=== Early life and education ===
Haidt was born to a secular Jewish family and was raised in Scarsdale, New York. His grandparents were Russian and Polish natives who immigrated as teenagers to the U.S., where they became garment workers. Haidt described his upbringing as "very assimilated", identifying as an atheist by age 15. His father, an Ashkenazi Jew, was a corporate lawyer. His family were generally New Deal liberals.

In 2024, Haidt recalled that, at age 17, he experienced an existential crisis upon reading Waiting for Godot and other existential literature. After attending Scarsdale High School, he graduated magna cum laude from Yale University with a Bachelor of Arts in philosophy in 1985, then briefly held a job as a computer programmer before pursuing graduate studies in psychology at the University of Pennsylvania, where he received a Master of Arts and Ph.D. in the field in 1988 and 1992, respectively, on a graduate fellowship awarded by the National Science Foundation. His dissertation, titled "Moral judgment, affect, and culture, or, is it wrong to eat your dog?", was supervised by psychologists Jonathan Baron and Alan Fiske. Inspired by anthropologist Paul Rozin, Haidt wrote his thesis on the morality of "harmless" but disgusting acts.

From July 1992 to June 1994, Haidt was an NIMH postdoctoral fellow at the University of Chicago, where he studied cultural psychology under the supervision of cultural anthropologist Richard Shweder. Haidt called Shweder "the teacher that most affected me". At Shweder's suggestion, Haidt researched moral complexity in Bhubaneswar, India, where he conducted field studies and "encountered a society in some ways patriarchal, sexist and illiberal". From July 1994 to August 1995, he was a postdoctoral associate with the MacArthur Foundation under psychologist Judith Rodin.

=== Academic career ===
In August 1995, Haidt became an assistant professor at the University of Virginia (UVA), where he was eventually named an associate professor in August 2001, then a full professor of the university's psychology department in August 2009. He remained at Virginia until 2011, winning four awards for teaching, (Note: Haidt received three teaching awards from the University of Virginia: the Outstanding Professor Award in 1998, the All-University Teaching Award in 2003, and a second Outstanding Professor Award that same year.) including a statewide award conferred by Governor Mark Warner. Haidt also earned a reputation for challenging the general assumptions in moral psychology. His research, centered on the emotional origins of morality with particular focus on the emotions of disgust and elevation, led to the publication of The Happiness Hypothesis in 2006.

In 1999, Haidt became active in the new field of positive psychology, studying positive moral emotions. This work led to the publication of an edited volume, Flourishing, in 2003. In 2004, Haidt began to apply moral psychology to the study of politics, doing research on the psychological foundations of ideology. This work led to the publication in 2012 of The Righteous Mind. Haidt spent the 2007–2008 academic year at Princeton University as the Visiting Professor for Distinguished Teaching. In July 2010, he delivered a talk at the Edge Foundation on the new advances in moral psychology.

In 2011, Haidt moved to New York University's Stern School of Business as the Thomas Cooley Professor of Ethical Leadership, relocating to New York City with his wife, Jayne, and two children. In 2013, he co-founded Ethical Systems, a non-profit organization which makes academic research on ethics more easily available to businesses. In 2015, Haidt co-founded Heterodox Academy, a non-profit organization that works to increase "viewpoint diversity" on college campuses, based on the belief that there is discrimination against conservatives at academic institutions. In 2018, Haidt and Richard Reeves co-edited an illustrated edition of John Stuart Mill's On Liberty, titled All Minus One: John Stuart Mill's Ideas on Free Speech Illustrated.

== Research contributions ==
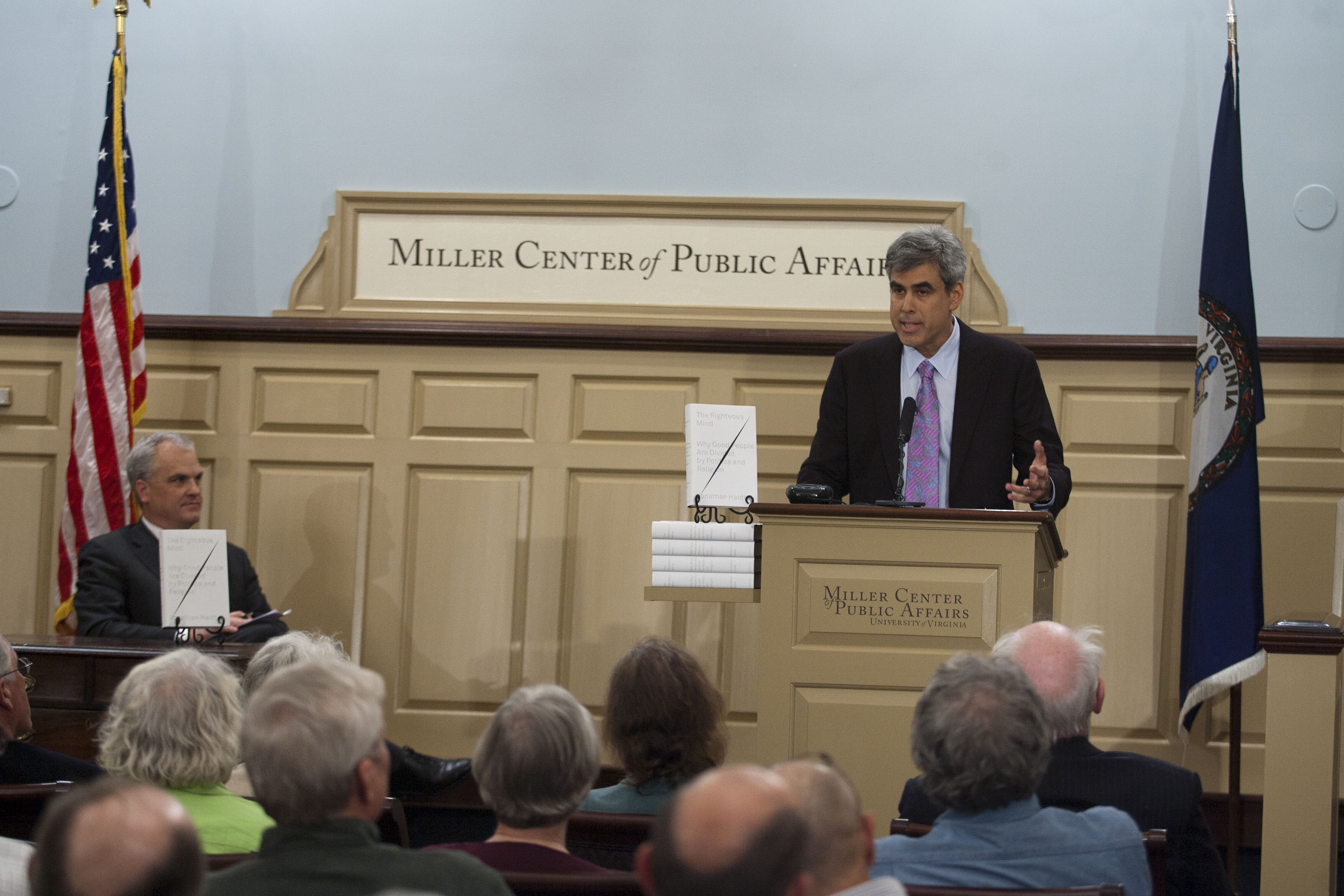
Haidt speaking at the Miller Center of Public Affairs in Charlottesville (March 19, 2012)

Haidt's research on morality has led to publications in four areas.

=== Moral disgust ===
Together with Paul Rozin and Clark McCauley, Haidt developed the Disgust Scale, which has been widely used to measure individual differences in sensitivity to disgust. Haidt, McCauley and Rozin have written on the psychology of disgust as an emotion that began as a guardian of the mouth (against pathogens), but then expanded during biological and cultural evolution to become a guardian of the body more generally, and of the social and moral order.

=== Moral elevation ===
With Sara Algoe, Haidt argued that exposure to stories about moral beauty (the opposite of moral disgust) cause a common set of responses, including warm, loving feelings, calmness, and a desire to become a better person. Haidt called the emotion "moral elevation", Feelings of moral elevation cause increases in milk produced during lactation in breastfeeding mothers, suggesting the involvement of the hormone oxytocin.

=== Social intuitionism ===
Haidt's principal line of research has been on the nature and mechanisms of moral judgment. In the 1990s, he developed the social intuitionist model, which posits that moral judgment is mostly based on automatic processes—moral intuitions—rather than on conscious reasoning. People engage in reasoning largely to find evidence to support their initial intuitions. Haidt's main paper on the social intuitionist model, "The Emotional Dog and its Rational Tail", has been cited over 7,800 times.

=== Moral foundations theory ===
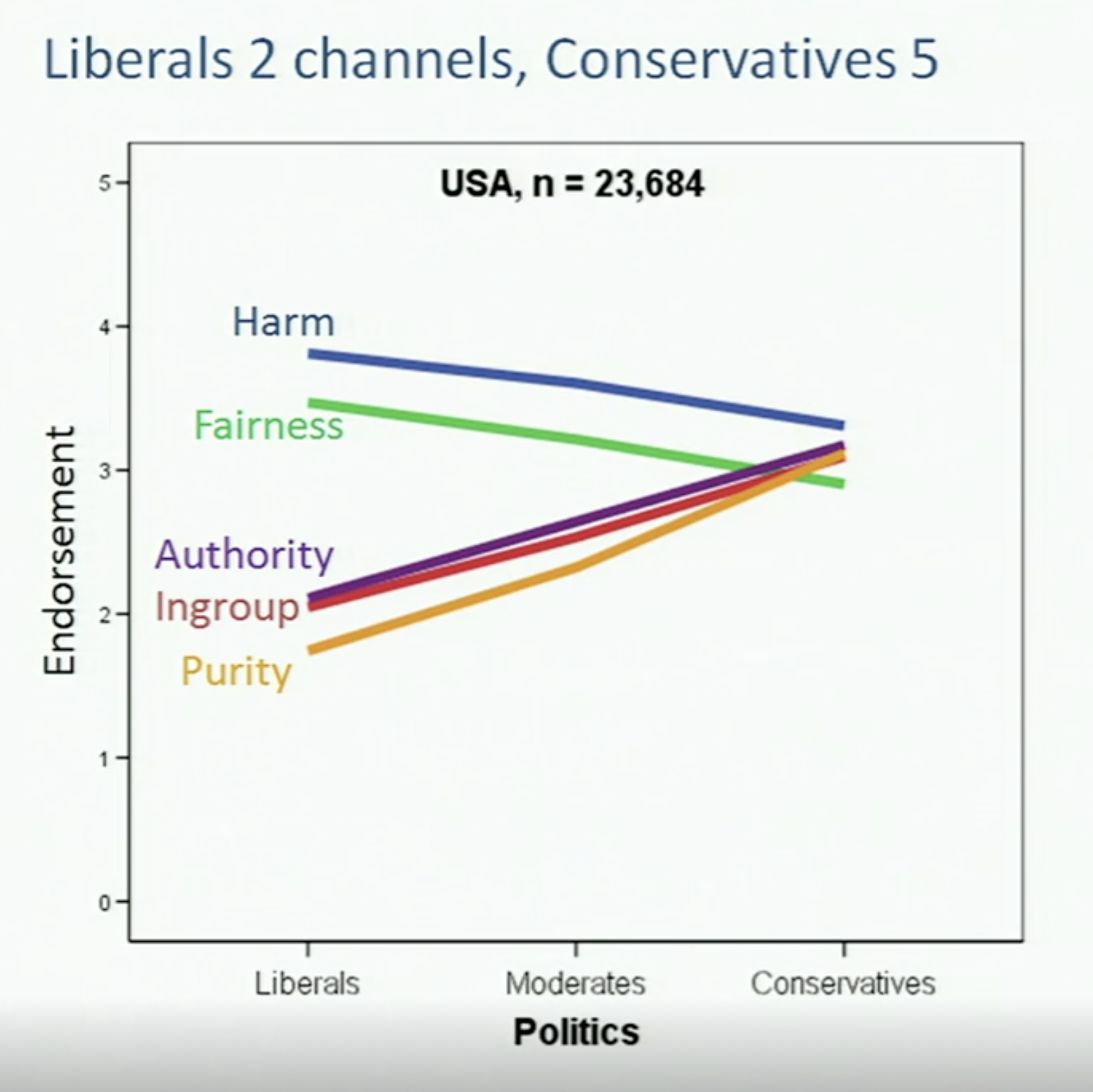
A simple graphic depicting survey data from the United States intended to support moral foundations theory

In 2004, Haidt began to extend the social intuitionist model to identify what he considered to be the most important categories of moral intuition. The resulting moral foundations theory, co-developed with Craig Joseph and Jesse Graham, and based in part on the writings of Richard Shweder, was intended to explain cross-cultural differences in morality. The theory posited that there are at least five innate moral foundations, upon which cultures develop their various moralities, just as there are five innate taste receptors on the tongue, which cultures have used to create many different cuisines. The five values are:

1. Care/harm
2. Fairness/cheating
3. Loyalty/betrayal
4. Authority/subversion
5. Sanctity/degradation

Haidt and his collaborators asserted that the theory also works well to explain political differences. According to Haidt, liberals tend to endorse primarily the care and fairness foundations, whereas conservatives tend to endorse all foundations more equally. Later, in The Righteous Mind, a sixth foundation, Liberty/oppression, was presented. More recently, Haidt and colleagues split the fairness foundation into equality (which liberals tend to endorse strongly) and proportionality (which conservatives tend to endorse strongly). In this work, they also developed the new revised Moral Foundations Questionnaire-2 which has 36 items, measuring Care, Equality, Proportionality, Loyalty, Authority, and Purity. He has also made the case for Ownership to be an additional foundation.

=== "The elephant and the rider" ===
One widely cited metaphor throughout Haidt's books is that of the elephant and the rider. His observations of social intuitionism, the notion that intuitions come first and rationalization second, led to the metaphor described in his work. The rider represents consciously controlled processes, and the elephant represents automatic processes. The metaphor corresponds to Systems 1 and 2 described in Daniel Kahneman's Thinking, Fast and Slow. This metaphor is used extensively in both The Happiness Hypothesis and The Righteous Mind.

== Political views ==
Haidt has referred to himself as a political centrist, and expressed a desire to reduce political polarization in the United States. In 2007, he founded the website CivilPolitics.org, a clearinghouse for research on political civility.

In a 2011 Ted talk, Haidt argued that liberals and conservatives differ in their value systems and that disciplines like psychology have biases against conservative viewpoints. He advocated incorporating conservative viewpoints in education.

In 2019, Haidt argued that there is a "very good chance American democracy will fail, that in the next 30 years we will have a catastrophic failure of our democracy" citing political polarization and the "culture war".

In 2022 Haidt resigned from the Society for Personality and Social Psychology after refusing to write an equity, inclusion, and anti-racism statement, which the Society requires presenters at its annual research conference to submit.

Haidt has been criticized for making homophobic and transphobic comments. He attributed "the recent growth in diagnoses of gender dysphoria" to social media.

Haidt was a speaker at an event at The Heritage Foundation in October 2025, where he encouraged parents and policy makers to continue pushing their school boards and state legislators for "bell-to-bell" cellphone bans in schools.

He has suggested that the underrepresentation of women in STEM fields is due to an innate difference in interests between men and women, and that the disparity is not necessarily an indication of discrimination. Haidt believes that "trigger warnings, affirmative action and accusations of sexist disparities weaken students through 'special treatment'".

Haidt is a member of the advisory board of the University of Austin, an unaccredited, "anti-woke", conservative organization.

== Reception ==
Some of his conclusions and methodologies are controversial.

Haidt was named one of the "top global thinkers" by Foreign Policy magazine in 2012, and one of the "top world thinkers" by Prospect magazine in 2013.

Although describing himself in 2007 as an atheist, Haidt argued at that time that religion contains psychological wisdom that can promote human flourishing, and that the New Atheists have themselves succumbed to moralistic dogma. These contentions elicited a variety of responses in a 2007 online debate sponsored by the website Edge; PZ Myers praised the first part of Haidt's essay while disagreeing with his criticism of the New Atheists; Sam Harris criticized Haidt for his perceived obfuscation of harms caused by religion; Michael Shermer praised Haidt; and biologist David Sloan Wilson joined Haidt in criticizing the New Atheists for dismissing the notion that religion is an evolutionary adaptation.

Developmental psychologist Candice Odgers has been one vocal critic of Haidt's findings and his assertions that social media and smart phones the cause of a mental health epidemic among children and teenagers, and that they have "rewired" adolescent brains. In a review of his book The Anxious Generation, published in the journal Nature, she notes that there is no data to support this claim, pointing to the work of hundreds of other researchers, and several meta-analyses and systematic reviews, including one analysis of data from 72 countries, none of which have found evidence of measurable associations between well-being and the use of social media and digital technology. Odgers writes: "the bold proposal that social media is to blame might distract us from effectively responding to the real causes of the current mental-health crisis in young people."

In 2026, students at New York University (NYU) objected to the school's choice of Haidt to deliver that year's commencement speech. The leadership of NYU's student government sent a letter to university officials asking them to reconsider, writing that many students "reported feelings of disappointment, disgust, unenthusiasm, defeat, and embarrassment," following the announcement, and that the school's choice of speaker did not "reflect the values and diversity of its graduates." Some students believed it was hypocritical for the school to invite Haidt, who is known for his advocacy for freedom of speech and diversity of thought on college campuses, as NYU had banned live student speeches at the event, following complaints the year prior about a student speaker who spoke about the genocide in Gaza. On May 14, Haidt's speech went ahead at Yankee Stadium, where he was booed by some in the crowd.

== Selected publications ==
=== Books ===
- Haidt, Jonathan (2006). The Happiness Hypothesis: Finding Modern Truth in Ancient Wisdom. Basic Books. ISBN 978-0-465-02802-3.

Discusses ancient philosophy in comparison to contemporary scientific research as applied to everyday life.

- Haidt, Jonathan (2013). The Righteous Mind: Why Good People Are Divided by Politics and Religion. Vintage Books. ISBN 978-0-307-45577-2.

Argues that moral judgments arise not from logical reason, but from gut feelings, asserting that liberals, conservatives, and libertarians have different intuitions about right and wrong because they prioritize different values.

- Haidt, Jonathan; Lukianoff, Greg (2018). The Coddling of the American Mind: How Good Intentions and Bad Ideas Are Setting Up a Generation for Failure. Penguin Press. ISBN 978-0-7352-2489-6. OCLC 1007552624.

An expansion of an essay Haidt and Lukianoff wrote for The Atlantic in 2015, the book discusses political polarization and changing culture on college campuses and the effect on mental health of the changes.

- Haidt, Jonathan (2024). The Anxious Generation: How the Great Rewiring of Childhood Is Causing an Epidemic of Mental Illness. Penguin Press. ISBN 978-0-593-65503-0.

A discussion of the effect of modern technology and parenting trends on children's mental health. Journalists Michael Hobbes and Peter Shamshiri have described many of its cited studies as methodologically weak, and say they do not support the claims Haidt makes in the book.

=== Articles ===
- Haidt, Jonathan; Koller, Silvia Helena; Dias, Maria G. (1993). "Affect, culture, and morality, or is it wrong to eat your dog?". Journal of Personality and Social Psychology. 65 (4): 613–628. doi:10.1037/0022-3514.65.4.613. PMID 8229648. S2CID 27964255.
- Haidt, Jonathan (2001). "The emotional dog and its rational tail: A social intuitionist approach to moral judgment". Psychological Review. 108 (4): 814–834. doi:10.1037/0033-295X.108.4.814. PMID 11699120.
- Wheatley, Thalia; Haidt, Jonathan (October 2005). "Hypnotic disgust makes moral judgments more severe". Psychological Science. 16 (10): 780–784. doi:10.1111/j.1467-9280.2005.01614.x. PMID 16181440.
- Haidt, Jonathan (May 18, 2007). "The New Synthesis in Moral Psychology". Science. 316 (5827): 998–1002. Bibcode:2007Sci...316..998H. doi:10.1126/science.1137651. PMID 17510357.
- Graham, Jesse; Haidt, Jonathan; Nosek, Brian A. (2009). "Liberals and Conservatives Rely on Different Sets of Moral Foundations" (PDF). Journal of Personality and Social Psychology. 96 (5): 1029–1046. doi:10.1037/a0015141. PMID 19379034.
- Haidt, Jonathan; Kesebir, Selin (2010). "Morality" (PDF). In Susan, Fiske; Gilbert, Daniel; Lindzey, Gardner (eds.). Handbook of Social Psychology (5th ed.). Hoboken, New Jersey: Wiley.
- Iyer, Ravi; Koleva, Spassena; Graham, Jesse; Ditto, Peter; Haidt, Jonathan (2012). "Understanding Libertarian Morality: The Psychological Dispositions of Self-Identified Libertarians". PLoS One. 7 (8) e42366. Bibcode:2012PLoSO...742366I. doi:10.1371/journal.pone.0042366. PMC 3424229. PMID 22927928.
- Duarte, José L.; Crawford, Jarret T.; Stern, Charlotta; Haidt, Jonathan; Jussim, Lee; Tetlock, Philip E. (July 18, 2014). "Political diversity will improve social psychological science". Behavioral and Brain Sciences. 38 e130. Cambridge University Press. doi:10.1017/S0140525X14000430. PMID 25036715.
- Haidt, Jonathan; Trevino, Linda (February 8, 2017). "Make business ethics a cumulative science". Nature Human Behaviour. 1 (27) 0027. doi:10.1038/s41562-016-0027.
