= Howard Margolis =

American interdisciplinary social scientist (1932–2009)

Howard Margolis (born 1932 – April 29, 2009) was an American interdisciplinary social scientist, with a background in political science and journalism.

== Early life and education ==
Margolis earned a BA in Government from Harvard University in 1953. After a career in journalism and a stint in government, he returned to academic studies at MIT, earning a PhD in Political Science in 1979.

== Career ==
Margolis was a founder of the "News & Comment" section of Science. He worked as a correspondent for the The Washington Post and the Bulletin of the Atomic Scientists. For public work, Margolis worked as a speechwriter for the United States Secretary of Defense and as a consultant to the National Academy of Sciences.

In academia, Margolis taught at the University of California, Irvine and conducted research for the Institute for Advanced Study, the Russell Sage Foundation, and the Massachusetts Institute of Technology.

From 1990 to 2009, Margolis was on the faculty of the University of Chicago and taught as well at the University of Chicago's Harris School of Public Policy Studies.

=== Areas of research ===
Margolis' work on social theory focuses on individual choice and judgments shaping aggregate social outcomes and involved mathematical modeling. Margolis also published extensively on cognition, public policy, and the history of science. A large portion of his work was focused on the fact that rational choice is all based on social motivation and self-interest combined.

== Bibliography ==
- Margolis, Howard (1982). Selfishness, Altruism, and Rationality: A Theory of Social Choice. Cambridge Press.
- Margolis, Howard (1987). Patterns, Thinking, and Cognition: A Theory of Judgment. University of Chicago Press.
- Margolis, Howard (1993). Paradigms and Barriers: How Habits of Mind Govern Scientific Belief. University of Chicago Press.
- Margolis, Howard (1996). Dealing with Risk: Why Expert and Lay Intuition Conflict, and What Might Be Done about It. University of Chicago Press.
- Margolis, Howard (2002). It Started with Copernicus: How Turning the World Inside Out Led to the Scientific Revolution. McGraw-Hill.
- Margolis, Howard (2007). Cognition and Extended Rational Choice. New York: Routledge.
