= Edward Haight =

Edward Haight may refer to:

- Edward Haight (politician) (1817–1885), American politician and businessman
- Edward Meeker Haight (1896–1975), American World War I flying ace
- Edward Haight (convict) (1925–1943), American teenager executed for the murders of Helen and Margaret Lynch
