= Moral foundations theory =

Theory in social psychology

In social psychology, moral foundations theory attempts to explain the origins of and variation in moral reasoning based on innate, modular foundations. It was first proposed by psychologists Jonathan Haidt, Craig Joseph, and Jesse Graham, building on the work of cultural anthropologist Richard Shweder. Mohammad Atari, Graham, and Haidt have revised some aspects of the theory and developed new measurements. Haidt's book The Righteous Mind. has popularized the theory. Proponents contend that morality is more than one thing. They initially proposed five foundations and later adding a sixth (Liberty/oppression):

- Care/harm
- Fairness/cheating
- Loyalty/betrayal
- Authority/subversion
- Sanctity/degradation
- Liberty/oppression.

The theory's proponents are open to adding, subtracting, and otherwise modifying the content of theory's foundations.

Initial development of moral foundations theory focused on cultural differences. Later work has concentrated on political ideology. Scholars have offered moral foundations theory as an explanation of differences among political progressives (liberals in the American sense), conservatives, and right-libertarians (libertarians in the American sense). Proponents believe that it can explain variation in opinion on politically charged issues such as same-sex marriage, abortion, and even vaccination.

== Origins ==
Studies on what Haidt and his colleagues termed "moral dumbfounding" preceded the moral foundations theory. Moral dumbfounding is the experience where a person has an intuitive response that an act is moral or immoral, but cannot rationally articulate what makes the act moral or not. Haidt argued that moral dumbfounding supported moral sentimentalism, the philosophical idea that emotion drives moral judgement, over moral rationalism. Work on exploring moral dumbfounding presented individuals with scenarios that did not cause physical harm, such as incest or cannibalism of the dead, to develop a framework based on moral intuitionism. Haidt and Joseph proposed five criteria to identify the potential innate emotional bases of morals:

1. A common effect on judgement from others
2. An immediate emotional response
3. Presence across multiple cultures
4. Evidence of a biological predisposition
5. Plausible evolutionary advantage.

Moral foundations theory was first proposed in 2004 by Haidt and Joseph. The theory emerged as a reaction against the developmental rationalist theory of morality associated with Lawrence Kohlberg and Jean Piaget, which argues that moral reasoning changes and develops over six stages of moral development, each more adequate than the last in addressing moral complexity. Kohlberg's work emphasized justice as the key concept in moral reasoning, seen as a primarily cognitive activity, and became the dominant approach to moral psychology, heavily influencing subsequent work. Haidt writes that he found Kohlberg's theories unsatisfying from the time he first encountered them in graduate school because they "seemed too cerebral" and lacked a focus on issues of emotion.

In contrast to the dominant theories of morality in psychology at the time, the anthropologist Richard Shweder developed a set of theories emphasizing the cultural variability of moral judgments, but argued that different cultural forms of morality drew on "three distinct but coherent clusters of moral concerns", which he labeled as the ethics of autonomy, community, and divinity. Shweder's approach inspired Haidt to begin researching moral differences across cultures, including fieldwork in Brazil and Philadelphia. This work led Haidt to begin developing his social intuitionist approach to morality. This approach, which stood in sharp contrast to Kohlberg's rationalist work, suggested that mostly "moral judgment is caused by quick moral intuitions" while moral reasoning simply serves largely as a post-hoc rationalization of already formed judgments. Haidt's work and his focus on quick, intuitive, emotional judgments quickly became very influential, attracting sustained attention from an array of researchers.

As Haidt and his collaborators worked within the social intuitionist approach, they began to devote attention to the sources of the intuitions that they believed underlay moral judgments. In a 2004 article published in the journal Daedalus, Haidt and Joseph surveyed works on the roots of morality, including the work of Frans de Waal, Donald Brown and Shweder, as well as Alan Fiske's relational models theory and Shalom Schwartz's theory of basic human values. From their review of these earlier lines of research, they suggested that all individuals possess four "intuitive ethics", stemming from the process of human evolution as responses to adaptive challenges. They labelled these four ethics as suffering, hierarchy, reciprocity, and purity.

Invoking the notion of preparedness, Haidt and Joseph claimed that each of the ethics formed a cognitive module, whose development was shaped by culture. They wrote that each module could "provide little more than flashes of affect when certain patterns are encountered in the social world", while a cultural learning process shaped each individual's response to these flashes. Morality diverges because different cultures utilize the four "building blocks" provided by the modules differently. Their Daedalus article became the first statement of moral foundations theory, which Haidt, Graham, Joseph, and others have since elaborated and refined, for example by splitting the originally proposed ethic of hierarchy into the separate moral foundations of ingroup and authority, and by proposing a tentative sixth foundation of liberty.

== Foundations ==
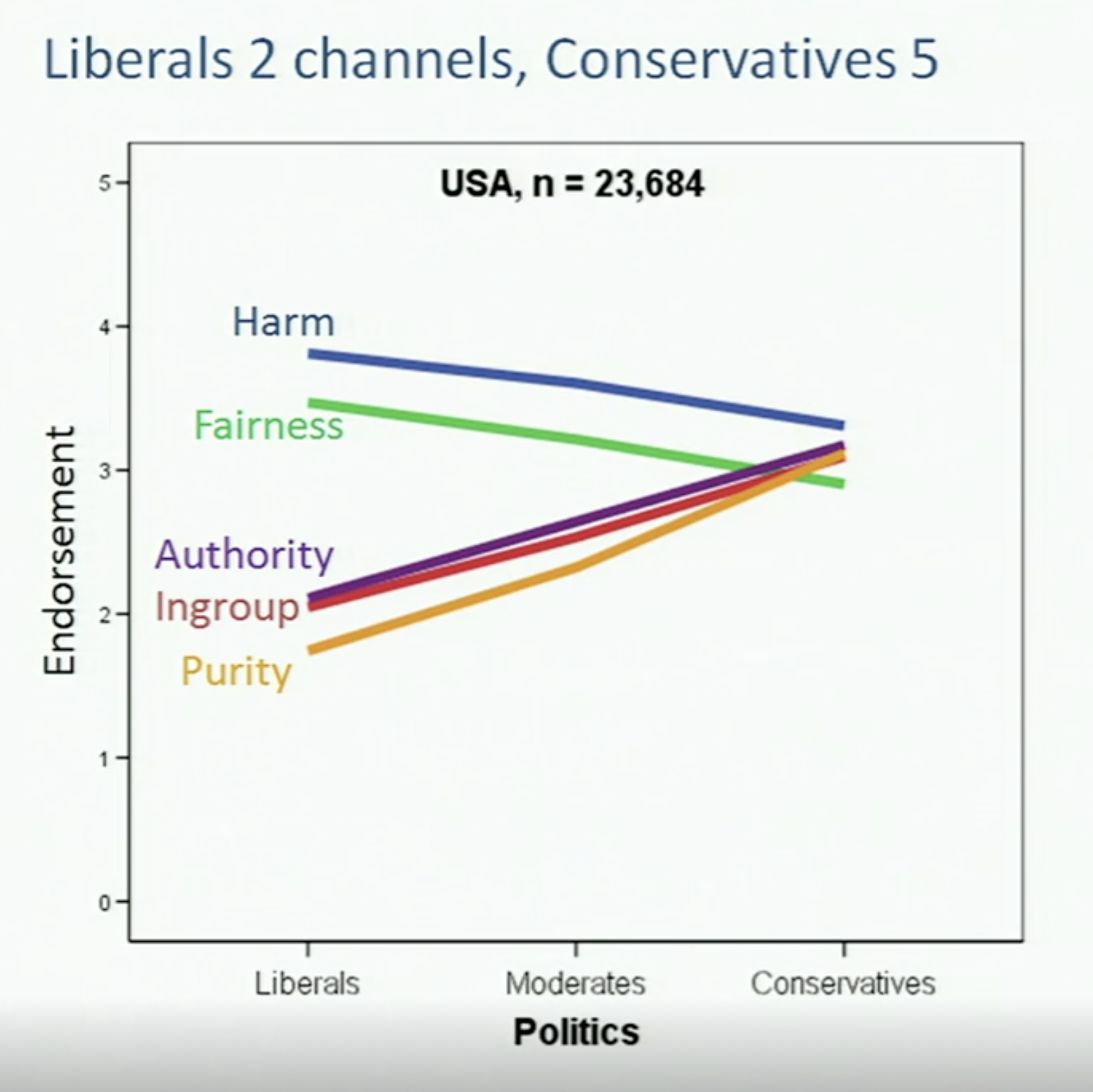
A simple graphic depicting survey data from the United States intended to support moral foundations theory

=== Main five ===
According to moral foundations theory, differences in people's moral concerns can be described in terms of five moral foundations: an individualizing cluster of Care and Fairness, and the group-focused binding cluster of Loyalty, Authority and Sanctity. The empirical evidence favoring this grouping comes from patterns of associations between the moral foundations observed with the Moral Foundations Questionnaire.

=== Liberty foundation ===
A sixth foundation, Liberty (opposite of oppression) was theorized by Jonathan Haidt in The Righteous Mind, chapter eight, in response to economic conservatives complaining that the 5 foundation model did not caption their notion of fairness correctly, which focused on proportionality, not equality. This means people are treated fairly based on what they have earned, and are not treated equally unconditionally. This sixth foundation changes the theory so that the fairness/cheating foundation no longer has a split personality; it's no longer about equality and proportionality. It primarily becomes about proportionality.

=== Honor/Qeirat foundation ===
In 2020, Mohammad Atari and Jesse Graham worked on a potential moral foundation which is particularly important in Middle Eastern cultures, namely honor or "Qeirat" (a Persian term, originally coming from Arabic). Interviews employing qualitative methods indicated that alongside moral considerations similar to those in the original conceptualization of MFT, a key element in Middle Eastern moral perspectives is "Qeirat". While this term lacks a direct translation in English, it closely aligns with the concept of 'honor' and encompasses the safeguarding and defense of female relatives, romantic partners, extended family members, and the nation. This research identified a strong correlation between Qeirat and Loyalty, Authority, and Purity, as well as adherence to Islamic religious beliefs, and behaviors associated with maintaining romantic relationships. These authors argued that Qeirat values operate in a way to maintain intensive kinship structures which can in turn function to keep resources in the group. These authors also developed and validated the 24-item Qeirat Values Scale (QVS).

=== Additional candidate foundations ===
Several other candidate foundations have also been discussed: Efficiency/waste, Ownership/theft, and Honesty/deception.

== Methods ==
=== Moral Foundations Questionnaire ===
A large amount of research on moral foundations theory uses self-report instruments such as the Moral Foundations Questionnaire, formally published in 2011 (though earlier versions of the questionnaire had already been published). Subsequent investigations using the Moral Foundations Questionnaire in other cultures have found broadly similar correlations between morality and political identification to those of the US, with studies taking place in Korea, Sweden and New Zealand. However, other studies suggest that the structure of the MFQ is inconsistent across demographic groups (e.g., comparing religious and non-religious and Black and White respondents) and across cultures.

A substantially updated version of the MFQ (the MFQ-2) was published in 2023. MFQ-2 is a 36-item measure of moral foundations which captures Care, Equality, Proportionality, Loyalty, Authority, and Purity. Each sub-scale has six items. MFQ-2 has been shown to have good psychometric properties across cultures.

=== Other methods ===
Other materials and methods used to study moral foundations theory include the Moral Foundations Sacredness Scale, Moral Foundations Vignettes, the Socio-Moral Image Database, and Character Moral Foundations Questionnaire. Research on moral language use have also relied on variants of a Moral Foundations Dictionary (MFD). Moral Foundations Dictionary 2 (MFD2) has been shown to outperform MFD, hence may be a better option for language-based assessment of moral foundations.

Researchers have also examined the topographical maps of somatosensory reactions associated with violations of different moral foundations. Specifically, in a study where participants were asked to describe key aspects of their subjective somatosensory experience in response to scenarios involving various moral violations, body patterns corresponding to violations of moral foundations were felt in different regions of the body depending on whether participants were liberal or conservative.

== Applications ==
=== Political ideology ===
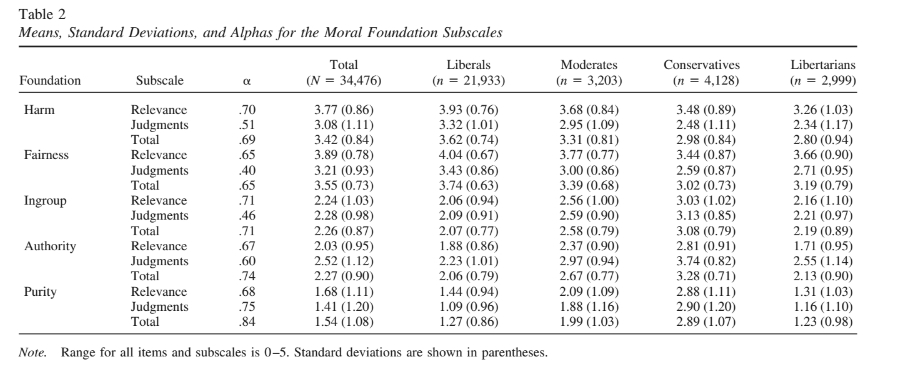
Results of the Moral Foundations Questionnaire

Researchers have found that people's sensitivities to the five/six moral foundations correlate with their political ideologies. Using the Moral Foundations Questionnaire, Haidt and Graham found that libertarians are most sensitive to the proposed Liberty foundation, liberals are most sensitive to the Care and Fairness foundations, while conservatives are equally sensitive to all five/six foundations.

According to Haidt, the differences have significant implications for political discourse and relations. Because members of two political camps are, to a degree, blind to one or more of the moral foundations of the others, they may perceive morally driven words or behavior as having another basis – at best self-interest, at worst evil, and thus demonize one another.

Haidt and Graham suggest a compromise can be found to allow liberals and conservatives to see eye-to-eye. They suggest that the five foundations can be used as "doorway" to allow liberals to step to the conservative side of the "wall" put up between these two political affiliations on major political issues (e.g. legalizing gay marriage). If liberals try to consider the latter three foundations in addition to the former two (therefore adopting all five foundations like conservatives for a brief amount of time) they could understand the conservatives' viewpoints.

Researchers postulate that the moral foundations arose as solutions to problems common in the ancestral hunter-gatherer environment, in particular intertribal and intra-tribal conflict. The three foundations emphasized more by conservatives (Loyalty, Authority, Sanctity) bind groups together for greater strength in intertribal competition while the other two foundations balance those tendencies with concern for individuals within the group. With reduced sensitivity to the group moral foundations, progressives tend to promote a more universalist morality.

The usefulness of moral foundations theory as an explanation for political ideology has been contested on the grounds that moral foundations are less heritable than political ideology, and longitudinal data suggest that political ideology predicts subsequent endorsement of moral foundations, but moral foundations endorsement does not predict subsequent political ideology. The latter finding suggests that the direction of causality is the opposite of what moral foundations theorists assume: moral judgments are produced by motivated reasoning anchored in political beliefs, rather than political beliefs being produced by moral intuitions. A 2023 study also showed that liberals and conservatives have different neural activations when processing violations of moral foundations, particularly in areas related to semantic processing, attention, and emotion, "suggesting that political ideology moderates the social-affective experience of moral violations".

=== Cross-cultural differences ===
Haidt's initial field work in Brazil and Philadelphia in 1989, and Odisha, India in 1993, showed that moralizing indeed varies among cultures, but less than by social class (e.g. education) and age. Working-class Brazilian children were more likely to consider both taboo violations and infliction of harm to be morally wrong, and universally so. Members of traditional, collectivist societies, like political conservatives, are more sensitive to violations of the community-related moral foundations. Adult members of so-called WEIRD (western, educated, industrialized, rich, and democratic) societies are the most individualistic, and most likely to draw a distinction between harm-inflicting violations of morality and violations of convention.

Recently, Jonathan Haidt and Mohammad Atari made the case that MFT, and especially MFQ-2, can be particularly useful for cross-cultural research, including the World Values Survey (WVS) community since WVS started adopting MFQ-2. MFT can be of significant assistance to researchers in their quest to understand worldwide psychological diversity and to those aiming to foster democracy globally, by focusing on at least four key areas. These areas include: (a) variation across populations; (b) variations in political views and the extent of polarization in different political systems around the globe; (c) shifts in cultural norms and values; and (d) the roles of institutions and the development of democratic processes.

=== Sex differences ===
A recent large-scale (u = 336,691) analysis of sex differences based on the five moral foundations suggested that women consistently score higher on care, fairness, and purity across 67 cultures. However, loyalty and authority were shown to have negligible sex differences, highly variable across cultures. This study, published in 2020 in Proceedings of the Royal Society B, also examined country-level sex differences in moral foundations in relation to cultural, socioeconomic, and gender-related indicators revealing that global sex differences in moral foundations are larger in individualistic, Western, and gender-equal cultures. Examining multivariate sex differences in the five moral foundations (i.e. Mahalanobis' D as well as its disattenuated bias-corrected version) in moral judgements, the authors concluded that multivariate effects were substantially larger than previously estimated sex differences in moral judgements using non-MFT frameworks and, more generally, the median effect size in social and personality psychology research. Mahalanobis' D of the five moral foundations were significantly larger in individualist and gender-equal countries.

=== Morality in language ===
Multiple studies have studied MFT in the context of natural language.

An early text analysis of religious sermons found that liberal clergy used more harm, fairness and ingroup words while conservative clergy used more authority and purity words. However, a large-scale replication and extension of this original text analysis study found only limited support for liberal-conservative differences in moral foundation language, with a 30% replication success rate and effect sizes approximately 38 times smaller than those originally reported.

Although people subjectively think that more than 20% of their daily conversations touch on morality, close examination of everyday language, using machine learning models, has shown that people do not actually talk much about morality (as measured by moral foundations) often. More specifically, only 4.7% of recorded conversations and 2.2% of social media posts (on Facebook) touched on morality, with Care and Fairness being more prevalent.

== Critiques and competing theories ==
A number of researchers have offered critiques of, and alternative theories to, moral foundations theory. Critiques of the theory have included claims of biological implausibility and redundancy among the moral foundations, which have been argued to be reducible to concern about harm or to threat-reducing versus empathizing motivations. Both critiques have been disputed by the original authors. Alternative theories include the model of moral motives, the theory of dyadic morality, relationship regulation theory, the right-wing authoritarianism scale developed by Bob Altemeyer, the theory of morality as cooperation, the theory of political ideology as motivated social cognition, and impartial approaches to ethical questions, such as justice as fairness by John Rawls and the categorical imperative by Immanuel Kant.

The Purity foundation in particular has been the subject of criticism due to the lack of evidence supporting the link between the emotion of disgust and Purity-related transgressions. Rather, research conducted in both the US and India, suggest that violations of the sacred (i.e., Purity-related transgressions) elicit a range of negative emotions (e.g., anger) rather than the specific emotion of core disgust associated with pathogen-related events.

Recent critiques of moral foundations theory have also highlighted the limitations of relying solely on moral values to explain moral cognition. Beal argues that moral cognition is fundamentally shaped by ontological framing, which refers to the ways in which individuals perceive and attribute inherent value to entities in their moral landscape (rather than by a fixed set of highly abstract moral foundations).

The moral foundations were found to be correlated with the theory of basic human values developed by Schwartz. The strong correlations are between conservative values in this theory and the binding foundations.

A 2026 study found no evidence that reframing political positions and issues to moral foundations shifted support among conservatives and liberals for those political issues.
