= Ann Rest =

American politician (born 1942)

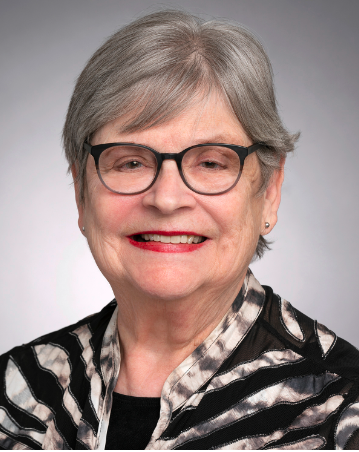
- Rest in 2023

President pro tempore of the Minnesota Senate
- Incumbent
- Assumed office February 3, 2025
- Preceded by: Herself
- In office January 3, 2023 – January 13, 2025
- Preceded by: David Tomassoni
- Succeeded by: Herself
- In office January 7, 2013 – January 3, 2017
- Preceded by: Gen Olson
- Succeeded by: Warren Limmer

Member of the Minnesota Senate
- Incumbent
- Assumed office January 3, 2001
- Preceded by: Ember Reichgott Junge
- Constituency: 46th district (2001–2013); 45th district (2013–2023); 43rd district (2023–present)

Member of the Minnesota House of Representatives from the 46A district
- In office January 8, 1985 – January 2, 2001
- Preceded by: Dorothy Hokr
- Succeeded by: Mark Thompson

Personal details
- Born: Ann Hiller; April 24, 1942 (age 84) Norfolk, Virginia, U.S.
- Party: Democratic
- Spouse: James Rest (divorced)
- Children: 1
- Education: Northwestern University (BA); University of Chicago (MA); Harvard University (MEd, MPA); University of Minnesota (MS)

Ann H. Rest (born April 24, 1942; née Ann Hiller) is an American politician and President pro tempore of the Minnesota Senate. A member of the Minnesota Democratic–Farmer–Labor Party (DFL), she represents District 43 which includes portions of the western suburbs of Hennepin County in the Twin Cities metro area.

== Early life, education, and career ==
Rest attended Rich Township High School in Park Forest, Illinois, graduating in 1960. She went to Northwestern University in Evanston, Illinois, where she received her B.A. degree in Latin and Greek. Next, she attended the University of Chicago on a Woodrow Wilson Fellowship earning a M.A.degree in Latin and Greek. She later received an M.A. in teaching from Harvard University, a master's in business taxation from the University of Minnesota, and a master's degree in public administration from Harvard's John F. Kennedy School of Government through a Bush Fellowship. She is a retired Certified Public Accountant.

Rest first moved to Minnesota in 1970. Following a career as a high school Latin and English teacher, she pivoted to work in tax policy and as a CPA after being laid off from her teaching job in 1979.

== Minnesota Legislature ==
Rest was elected to the House of Representatives in 1984. Rest requested Governor Arne Carlson call a special session of the legislature in 1997 to secure funding for a new Minnesota Twins stadium. The session lasted 23 days but no agreement was made.

Rest was first elected to the Senate in 2000, and was re-elected in 2002, 2006, 2010, 2012, 2016, 2020 and 2022. She served as an assistant majority leader from 2003 to 2007 and Senate President Pro Tempore 2013–2017 and 2023–present .

Before being elected to the Senate, Rest represented District 46A in the Minnesota House of Representatives for 16 years, being first elected in 1984, and re-elected in 1986, 1988, 1990, 1992, 1994, 1996 and 1998. She was an assistant majority leader of the House from 1989 to 1991. She chaired the House Tax Committee from 1993 to 1997, and the House Local Government and Metropolitan Affairs Committee from 1997 to 1999. She chaired the Senate State and Local Government Operations and Oversight Committee from 2007 to 2011.

For the 2023 - 2026 Senate term, Rest is serving as Senate President Pro Tempore and on the following committees and commissions: Taxes, (Chair), Rules (Vice Chair), Commerce, Elections, Tax Expenditure Review Commission (Chair, 2023-2025); Legislative Audit Commission 2023-2027) Capitol Preservation Commission (2023–present); Great Lakes Commission; Great Lakes / St. Lawrence Legislative Caucus (Executive Committee, Past President, founding member).

Her special legislative concerns include tax policy, commerce, transit policy, election laws and housing policy.

== Assassination attempt ==
On June 16, 2025, it was revealed that Rest was directly targeted by Vance Boelter, the man who killed Minnesota House Democratic Leader and former House Speaker Melissa Hortman and her husband and shot and seriously injured state senator John Hoffman and his wife. Police spotted Boelter parked near the Rest home in New Hope, Minnesota on June 14, 2025, the same evening as the other shootings. He left the area after encountering police officers.

== Personal life ==
Rest has been active on numerous government and community boards through the years. She is a member of the National Caucus of Environmental Legislators, and NCSL's Executive Committee's Task Force on State and Local Taxation. She is a past president of Streamline Sales Tax Governing Board and serves on the Executive Committee. Rest was a member of the Minnesota Statehood Sesquicentennial Commission (2006–2008) and served on the Minnesota Capitol Area Architectural Planning Board and the Capitol Preservation Commission. Rest is a Minnesota delegate to the Great Lakes Commission and was a founding member of the Great Lakes Legislative Caucus, which she also chaired.

Rest is a noted Minnesota Twins fan and has supported the team since she was a child growing up in Virginia when the Twins were the Washington Senators.

Minnesota Senate
Preceded by Gen Olson	President pro tempore of the Minnesota Senate; 2013–2017	Succeeded by Warren Limmer
Preceded by David Tomassoni	President pro tempore of the Minnesota Senate; 2022–present	Incumbent
