= Academic dishonesty =

Any type of cheating that occurs in relation to a formal academic exercise

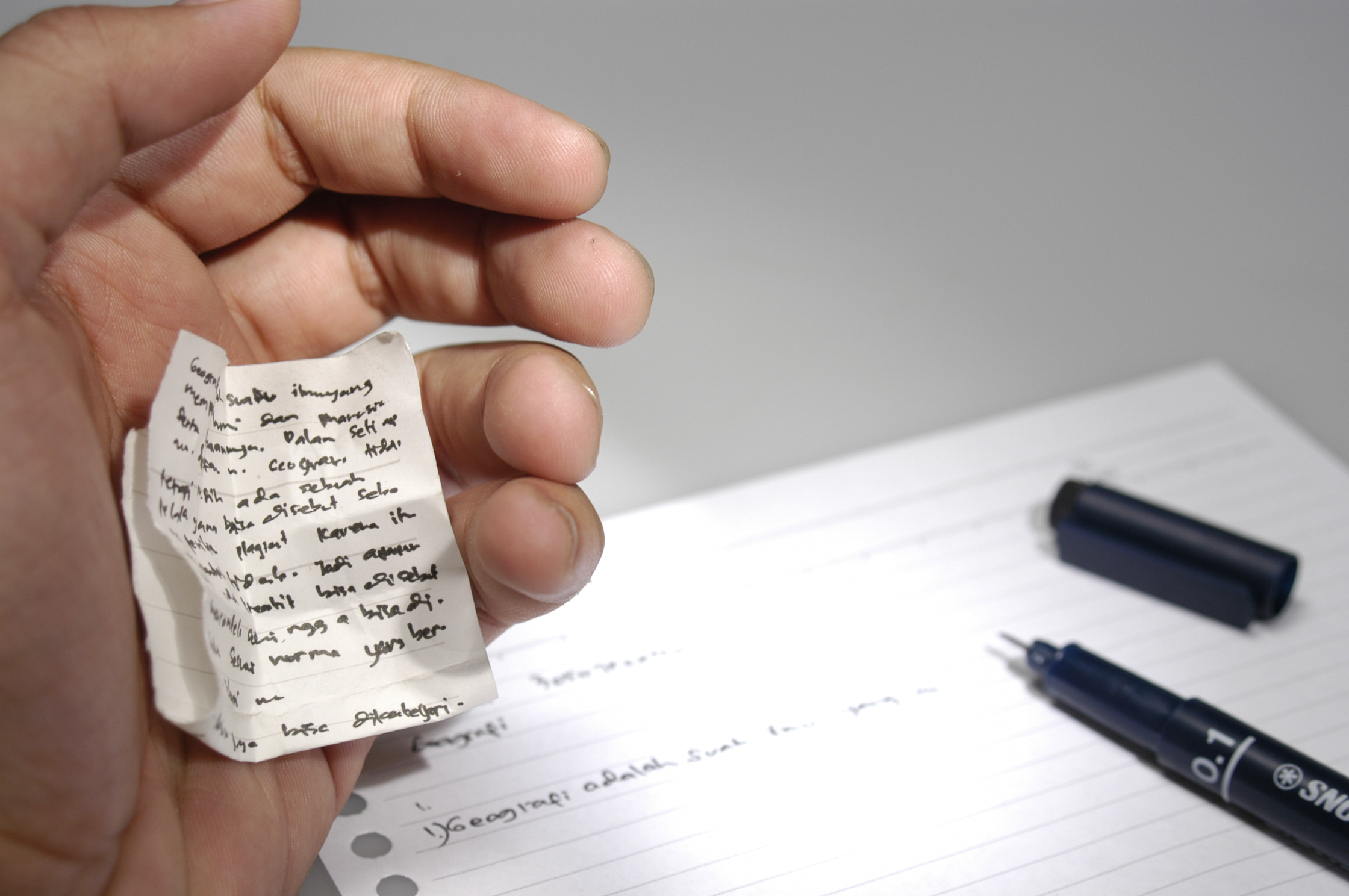
An example of school exam cheating, a type of academic dishonesty

Academic dishonesty, academic misconduct, academic fraud and academic integrity are related concepts that refer to various actions on the part of students that go against the expected norms of a school, university or other learning institution. Definitions of academic misconduct are usually outlined in institutional policies. Therefore, academic dishonesty consists of many different categories of behaviour, as opposed to being a singular concept.

== Definition ==
Academic dishonesty does not have a universal definition. Educational institutions in different regions understand and act on academic dishonesty in different ways. Much like many other areas of student affairs, academic integrity also boasts organizations that help students, faculty and staff of postsecondary institutions discuss and understand the values of academic integrity such as the International Centre for Academic Integrity (ICAI). Multiple institutions, such as the University of Waterloo, Queen's University, University of Colorado and York University base their culture of academic integrity on ICAI's 6 fundamental values (honesty, trust, respect, fairness, responsibility and courage).

== History ==
Academic dishonesty dates back to the first tests. Scholars note that cheating was prevalent on the Chinese civil service exams thousands of years ago, even when cheating carried the penalty of death for both examinee and examiner. Bribery of examiners was also common, as represented in works such as the Ming-dynasty story collection The Book of Swindles.

Standards for citation and referencing began at the end of the 19th century with the emergence of guidance provided by scholarly societies that developed discipline-specific expectations for referencing such as the MLA and the APA. About the same time, scholars began researching issues related to cheating, with some early research dating back to the late 19th century and early 20th centuries, when cheating was identified as a widespread problem at college campuses in the United States. It has been estimated that as many as two-thirds of students cheated at some point of their college careers at the turn of the 20th century. Fraternities often operated so-called essay banks, where term papers were kept on file and could be resubmitted over and over again by different students, often with the only change being the name on the paper. The issue of academic dishonesty became more prominent in the latter half of the twentieth century, as universities shifted towards more democratic approaches to admission.

== Types ==
=== Cheating ===
Cheating can take the form of cheat sheets, looking over someone's shoulder during an exam, or any forbidden sharing of information between students regarding an exam or exercise. Many elaborate methods of cheating have been developed over the years. For instance, students have been documented hiding cheat sheets or notes in the bathroom toilet tank, in the brims of their baseball caps, up their sleeves, along their thighs or in their cleavage. Also, the storing of information in graphing calculators, pagers, cell phones, and other electronic devices has cropped up since the information revolution began. While students have long surreptitiously scanned the tests of those seated near them, some students actively try to aid those who are trying to cheat. Methods of secretly signalling the right answer to friends are quite varied, ranging from coded sneezes or pencil tapping to high-pitched noises beyond the hearing range of most teachers. Some students have been known to use more elaborate means, such as using a system of repetitive body signals like hand movements or foot jerking to distribute answers (i.e. where a tap of the foot could correspond to answer "A", two taps for answer "B", and so on).

One other method is taking advantage of time zones, particularly in exams administered worldwide. Those who take the exam first (likely in Oceania) can then post answers for those about to take the exam (in a time zone behind like Europe).

=== Impersonation ===
Impersonation is a form of cheating whereby a different person than the student assigned an assignment or exam completes it. Attending a class or completing an interview on another student's behalf is also considered impersonation. The academic work is totally 'outsourced' to another person or organization, usually for pay.

==== Contract cheating ====
Contract cheating, also known as ghostwriting, is similar to impersonation in that a student hires a third party to complete work on their behalf. Essay mills fall under this category. While it is believed that contract cheating has significantly increased since 2014, there are currently no figures to demonstrate this surge. This is a relatively new form of cheating, seemingly gaining traction in the 1940s when an increasing amount of advertisements for ghostwriters could be seen on university campuses and in newspapers. This trend continued to grow into the 1960s and 1970s. According to a study conducted in 2019, it is estimated that the ghostwriting industry produces a revenue of approximately $100 million.

=== Plagiarism ===
Plagiarism, as defined in the 1995 Random House Compact Unabridged Dictionary, is the "use or close imitation of the language and thoughts of another author and the representation of them as one's own original work". In academia, this can range from borrowing without attribution a particularly apt phrase, to paraphrasing someone else's original idea without citation, to wholesale contract cheating.

Europe developed the modern concept of plagiarism as immoral and originality as an ideal in the 18th century, while in the previous centuries authors and artists were encouraged to "copy the masters as closely as possible" and avoid "unnecessary invention". The 18th century new morals were institutionalized and enforced prominently in the sectors of academia (including academic science, education, engineering etc.) and journalism, where plagiarism is now considered academic dishonesty and a breach of journalistic ethics, subject to sanctions like expulsion and other severe career damages. Not so in the arts, which have resisted in their long-established tradition of copying as a fundamental practice of the creative process. As of the 21st century, artists continue to tolerate plagiarism.

Plagiarism is not a crime but is disapproved more on the grounds of moral offence.

Since 2000, discussions on the subjects of student plagiarism have increased with a major strand of this discussion centering on the issue of how best students can be helped to understand and avoid plagiarism. Given the serious consequences that plagiarism has for students, there has been a call for a greater emphasis on learning in order to help students avoid committing plagiarism.

Also under the scope of plagiarism is self-plagiarism. Self-plagiarism occurs when a student submits an assignment, essay, or piece of work that was originally submitted for another course without the instructor's permission to do so.

Tomar and Chan concluded that students with access to AI-generated websites such as ChatGPT are more likely to plagiarize their assignments and claim the work from the websites as their own. Because ChatGPT generates human-like text, it can increase actions of ghostwriting, such as students using direct information from their sources without giving proper citations. In an article published by Intelligent.com, Dr. Ronnie Gladden argued that "In essence, originality and rigor absolutely matter. And critical consciousness and independent thought must be fostered, and I will fiercely defend those elements."

Cebrián-Robles discussed the risks of using AI tools in academia, such as the need to monitor online activity, as well as the struggle between academic honesty and AI. According to a survey done by the Chalmers University of Technology, "62 percent [of students] believe that using chatbots during examinations is cheating."

=== Sabotage ===
In the academic context, sabotage occurs when one commits acts to disrupt another person's work with the intention of preventing them from completing it successfully. Examples include disrupting another person's research, destroying important documents and also hacking computers used for research.

=== Abuse of confidentiality ===
This takes place when data or results from research or a piece of academic work is disseminated or shared while the author(s) expectation was for them to remain confidential.

=== Aiding and abetting ===
Aiding and abetting is the act of helping, enabling or encouraging someone to engage or attempt to engage in any act of academic dishonesty.

=== Improper research practices ===
Improper research practices involve fabricating, misrepresenting or selectively reporting research data as well as not giving proper credit to authors or researchers when reporting results of their work.

== Prevalence ==
=== United States ===
In the United States, one study has shown that 20 percent of students started cheating in the first grade. Similarly, other studies reveal that currently in the U.S., 56 percent of middle school students and 70 percent of high school students have cheated. Students are not the only ones to cheat in an academic setting. A study among North Carolina school teachers found that 35 percent of respondents said they had witnessed their colleagues cheating in one form or another. The rise of high-stakes testing and the consequences of the results on the teacher is cited as a reason why a teacher might want to inflate the results of their students.

The first scholarly studies in the 1960s of academic dishonesty in higher education found that nationally in the U.S., somewhere between 50 and 70 percent of college students had cheated at least once. While nationally, these rates of cheating in the U.S. remain stable today, there are large disparities between different schools, depending on the size, selectivity, and anti-cheating policies of the school. Generally, the smaller and more selective the college, the less cheating occurs there. For instance, the number of students who have engaged in academic dishonesty at small elite liberal arts colleges can be as low as 15–20 percent, while cheating at large public universities can be as high as 75 percent. Moreover, researchers have found that students who attend a school with an honor code are less likely to cheat than students at schools with other ways of enforcing academic integrity. As for graduate education, a recent study found that 56 percent of MBA students admitted cheating, along with 54 percent of graduate students in engineering, 48 percent in education, and 45 percent in law.

There is also a great difference in students' perceptions and the reality of their own ethical behavior. In a 2008 survey of 30,000 students in high school carried out by the Josephson Institute for Youth Ethics, 62 percent of students polled said they "copied another's homework two or more times in the past year." Yet, on the same survey, 92 percent said they were "satisfied with their personal ethics and character."

As more students take courses and assessments online, there is a persistent perception that it is easier to cheat in an online class than a face-to-face course. Moreover, there are online services that offer to prepare any kind of homework of high school and college level and take online tests for students. While administrators are often aware of such websites, they have been unsuccessful in curbing cheating in homework and non-proctored online tests, resorting to a recommendation by the Ohio Mathematics Association to derive at least 80 percent of the grade of online classes from proctored tests. In addition, colleges and universities are increasingly turning to online proctoring services to oversee tens of thousands of exams per year.

=== Germany ===
A large-scale study in Germany found that 75 percent of the university students admitted that they conducted at least one of seven types of academic misconduct (such as plagiarism or falsifying data) within the previous six months.

== Other countries ==
While academic dishonesty in other countries is researched less extensively, anecdotal evidence suggests cheating could be even more common in countries like Japan.

== Causes ==
There are a variety of causes of academic misconduct. Researchers have studied the correlation of cheating to personal characteristics, demographics, contextual factors, methods of deterring misconduct, even stages of moral development. There is some evidence in research to suggest that individuals with "type A" personalities who often attempt to obtain high degrees of success, are most likely to be reported on for academic misconduct (cheating).

=== Incentives to cheat ===
Some scholars contend that there are students who have a pathological urge to cheat. The writer Thomas Mallon noted that many scholars had found plagiarism in literature (Samuel Taylor Coleridge and Charles Reade being two notable examples) to often be perpetrated in a way similar to kleptomania (a psychological disease associated with uncontrollable stealing, even when it is against the interests of the thief). On the other hand, Mallon concludes it is probable that most "cheaters" make a rational choice to commit academic misconduct. A common reason for unethical behavior is the desire to "gain a competitive advantage in the race for position or power".

Richard Fass puts forward the possibility that business scandals in the real world make students believe dishonesty is an acceptable method for achieving success in contemporary society. Academic dishonesty, in this case, would be practice for the real world. For some students, there would be a dichotomy between success and honesty, and their decision is that: "It is not that we love honesty less, but that we love success more." Conversely, other scholars consider that with a rise in corporate ethics related dismissals in the business world circa 2005, this approach to cheating may be losing its appeal, if it ever really had any. However, it has been shown that the expected benefits of cheating as well as student's morality plays an important role for the engagement in dishonest behavior.

There have been studies that have looked into success and academic dishonesty; one study showed that students given an unexpected opportunity to cheat did not improve their grades significantly from the control group. Another study showed that students who were allowed to bring cheat sheets to a test did not improve their grades. One survey found that 13% of males and 46% of females think cheating does not help grades.

In the US, William Bowers reported that, on average, one third of grade A students cheated in 1964. He asserts that academic dishonesty acts as a shortcut, so even grade A students might be tempted to cheat. He contends that even if a plagiarized paper receives a relatively low grade, that grade is actually high, given how much time and effort went into the paper. In the study mentioned above (in which students were allowed to bring crib sheets to a test but did not improve their scores), the researcher concluded that the students used the crib notes as alternatives to studying, rather than as complements to studying, and thus spent less time preparing for the exam.

==== Teachers ====
The federal government of the United States has mandated high-stakes testing as part of the No Child Left Behind Act, signed into law in 2002. Schools and teachers are held accountable for the results. According to Steven Levitt and Stephen Dubner, co-authors of Freakonomics, teachers are known to "teach to the test": while not teaching the actual answers, they teach the questions and similar ones, and they neglect any topic that will not be tested on. Levitt also states that teachers may inflate the results of tests given in their classroom. Teachers and librarians can have a significant proactive impact on doing honest work.

=== Demographic and personal causes ===
Research has identified a number of demographic characteristics that appear to be important influences on cheating, including age, gender and grade point average. Older students, females, and students with higher academic achievement are less likely to cheat, whereas students involved with many extra-curricular activities are more likely to do so. Students involved in extra-curricular activities may be less committed to their studies, or may have more demands on their time, which interfere with their studies, creating a greater incentive to cheat. It has been found that younger students are somewhat more likely to cheat: one study finding the highest incidence of cheating occurs during sophomore year at college. Although cheating might be expected to decline with greater moral development, one experiment found that there was no relationship between how a student performed on a morality test and their likelihood of cheating (that is, students at a pre-conventional stage of morality are as likely to cheat as those at a post-conventional stage). Higher academic procrastination was also found to increase the frequency of seven different forms of academic misconduct (using fraudulent excuses, plagiarism, copying from someone else in exams, using forbidden means in exams, carrying forbidden means into exams, copying parts of homework from others, and fabrication or falsification of data) as well as the variety of academic misconduct.

Race, nationality, and class all show little correlation with academic misconduct. There is also no correlation between how religious someone is and the likelihood that the person will cheat. A comparison between students of different religions yielded similar results, although the study did show that Jews tend to cheat less than members of other religions. One of the strongest demographic correlations with academic misconduct in the United States is with language. Students who speak English as a second language have been shown to commit academic dishonesty more and are more likely to be caught than native speakers, since they will often not want to rewrite sources in their own words, fearing that the meaning of the sentence will be lost through poor paraphrasing skills. In the University of California system, international students make up 10% of the student body but comprise 47% of academic dishonesty cases. In British universities, students from outside of the European Union make up 12% of the student body but comprise 35% of academic dishonesty cases.

Impostor syndrome and academically dishonest behaviours have been found to be correlated. Students who do not believe they deserve to be where they are in terms of academics actively engage in self-sabotaging behaviour (plagiarism and cheating) in order to prove that they do not belong where they are while students who do not suffer from impostor syndrome are less likely to engage in academic dishonesty.

=== Contextual causes ===
Contextual factors that individual teachers can affect often make the least difference on cheating behavior. A study found that increasing the distance between students taking an exam has little effect on academic misconduct, and that threatening students before an exam with expulsion if they cheat actually promotes cheating behavior. Indeed, increased exam proctoring and other methods of detecting cheating in the classroom are largely ineffective. According to one survey of American college students, while 50% had cheated at least once in the previous six months, and 7% had cheated more than five times in that period, only 2.5% of the cheaters had been caught. As teachers invent more elaborate methods of deterring cheating, students invent even more elaborate methods of cheating (sometimes even treating it as a game), leading to what some teachers call a costly and unwinnable arms race. Increased punishment for academic misconduct also has little correlation with cheating behavior. It has been found that students with markedly different perceptions of what the severity of the punishment for cheating were all equally likely to cheat, probably indicating that they thought that increased penalties were immaterial since their cheating would never be discovered. However, if a professor makes clear that they disapprove of cheating, either in the syllabus, in the first class, or at the beginning of a test, academic dishonesty can drop by 12%. Some professors may have little incentive to reduce cheating in their classes below a point that would otherwise be obvious to outside observers, as they are rated by how many research papers they publish and research grants they win for the college, and not by how well they teach.

Teachers can, however, accidentally promote cheating behavior. A study found a correlation between how harsh or unfair a professor is perceived as and academic misconduct, since students see cheating as a way of getting back at the teacher. Also, students who see themselves in a competition, such as when the teacher is using a grade curve, are more likely to cheat. Research has also shown a correlation between goal orientation and the occurrence of academic cheating. Students who perceive their classroom to have high mastery goals are less likely to engage in cheating than those who perceive their classroom to emphasize performance goals.

The most important contextual causes of academic misconduct are often out of individual teachers' hands. One very important factor is time management. One survey reported two-thirds of teachers believed that poor time management was the principal cause of cheating. Often social engagements are to blame. It has been found that there is a strong correlation between extracurricular activities and cheating, especially among athletes, even those on intramural teams. It has also been found that student cheating rates rise significantly the more time students spend playing cards, watching television, or having a few drinks with friends. Relatedly, fraternity or sorority membership is also strongly correlated with academic misconduct.

One of the most important causes of academic misconduct is the contextual factor of an environment of peer disapproval of cheating, that is, peer pressure. Psychologists note that all people tend to follow the norms of their peer group, which would include norms about academic dishonesty. Thus, students who believe that their peers disapprove of cheating are less likely to cheat. Indeed, multiple studies show that the most decisive factor in a student's decision to cheat is his perception of his peers' relationship with academic dishonesty. For instance, on average 69% of students cheat at colleges with low community disapproval of academic misconduct, whereas only about 23% of students cheat at colleges with strong community disapproval of academic misconduct. Peer pressure works both ways, as a study found that there is a 41% increase in the probability of a student cheating if they have seen someone else cheat. However, even if most students strongly disapprove of cheating, there has to be a community in order for those norms to be enforced via peer pressure. For instance, larger schools, which usually have much higher cheating rates than small schools, tend to have a weaker community, being more split up into different peer groups that exert little social pressure on each other. Another measure of a college community, how many students live on campus, further shows a significant relation with a school's cheating rate. Relatedly, many professors argue that smaller classes reduce cheating behavior.

=== Ethical causes ===
No matter what the demographic or contextual influences are on a student who decides to engage in cheating behavior, before they can cheat they must overcome their own conscience. This depends both on how strongly someone disapproves of academic dishonesty and what types of justifications the student uses to escape a sense of guilt. For instance, students who personally do not have a moral problem with academic misconduct can cheat guilt-free. However, while many students have been taught and have internalized that academic dishonesty is wrong, it has been shown that on average a third of students who strongly disapprove of cheating have in fact cheated. People who cheat despite personal disapproval of cheating engage in something called "neutralization", in which a student rationalizes the cheating as being acceptable due to certain mitigating circumstances. According to psychologists of deviant behavior, people who engage in neutralization support the societal norm in question, but "conjure up" reasons why they are allowed to violate that norm in a particular case. Neutralization is not a simple case of ex post facto rationalization, but is rather a more comprehensive affair, occurring before, during, and after the act of cheating. Researchers have found four major types of neutralization of academic dishonesty, which they categorize by type of justification. Denial of responsibility – that is, the accusation that others are to blame or that something forced the student to cheat – is the most common form of neutralization among college students who cheated, with 61% of cheaters using this form of justification. Condemnation of condemner – that is, that the professors are hypocrites or brought it on themselves – is the second most common form of college student neutralization at 28%. The third most popular form of neutralization among college students is the appeal to higher loyalties, where the student thinks their responsibility to some other entity, usually their peers, is more important than doing what they know to be morally right. About 6.8% of cheaters in higher education use this form of neutralization. Denial of injury – thinking that nobody is worse off for the cheating – is the fourth most popular kind of neutralization at 4.2% of cheaters.

=== Cultural considerations ===
Many studies have revealed that academic honesty is not a universal concept. Some cultures accept the memorization and regurgitation of information, without citing sources, while others would consider this plagiarism. Additionally, some cultures believe that knowledge belongs to everyone and that this knowledge needs to be shared. Studies have shown that in certain Asian cultures, it is more important to share information widely than to properly cite the owner of this knowledge. One study found that graduate students in China were more likely than students in Denmark to say they would grant authorship on peer-reviewed academic papers to colleagues who are close relationships but did not contribute to the paper.

=== COVID-19 and academic dishonesty ===
Cases of academic dishonesty increased during the COVID-19 pandemic. As a result of the sudden transition from in-person to online course delivery, instructors (who may have been engaging in the same evaluation practices for years) did not have the opportunity to consider how to deliver online evaluations, how they differ from in-person evaluations and what the online process entails. The sharing of academic files, contract cheating and the unauthorized receipt of assistance from classmates and other sources increased due to the transition to online course delivery.

== Effects ==
Students who engage in neutralization to justify cheating, even once, are more likely to engage in it in the future, potentially putting them on a road to a life of dishonesty. One study found that students who are dishonest in class are more likely to engage in fraud and theft on the job when they enter the workplace.

Academic dishonesty also creates problems for teachers. In economic terms, cheating causes an underproduction of knowledge, where the professor's job is to produce knowledge. Moreover, a case of cheating often will cause emotional distress to faculty members, many considering it to be a personal slight against them or a violation of their trust. Dealing with academic misconduct is often one of the worst parts of a career in education, one survey claiming that 77% of academics agreed with the statement "dealing with a cheating student is one of the most onerous aspects of the job".

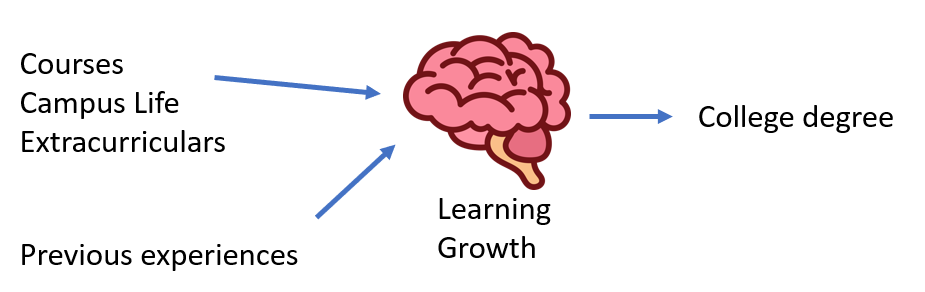
Learning happens in the learner's brain, and a college degree should reflect that learning. By bypassing the learner's brain, academic misconduct prevents learning, and if not caught, undermines the validity of academic degrees.

Ultimately, academic dishonesty undermines the academic world. It interferes with the basic mission of education, the transfer of knowledge, by allowing students to get by without having to master the knowledge. Furthermore, academic dishonesty creates an atmosphere that is not conducive to the learning process, which affects honest students as well. When honest students see cheaters escape detection, it can discourage student morale, as they see the rewards for their work cheapened. Cheating also undermines academia when students steal ideas. Ideas are a professional author's "capital and identity", and if a person's ideas are stolen it retards the pursuit of knowledge.

If never formally retracted, fraudulent publications can remain an issue for many years as articles and books remain on shelves and continue to be cited. The case of S. Walter Poulshock, a 1960s early-career historian whose work was found to contain wholly fabricated material, was exposed in 1966 with The American Historical Review providing a warning on the topic. Nonetheless, his book was never removed from the shelves of many university libraries and (together with his related thesis) was still being cited in 2013, 47 years after it was intended to have been withdrawn by its publisher.

== Deterrence ==
Historically, the college professor was considered to act in loco parentis, and was therefore permitted to regulate student behavior as a parent.

In Australia, the Tertiary Education Quality and Standards Agency addresses academic dishonesty. In the United Kingdom, the Quality Assurance Agency is responsible for quality assurance in higher education. It has produced several policy and guidance documents for policy makers, educators and the general public.

=== Honor codes ===
First at the College of William and Mary in 1779, and then followed by schools like the University of Virginia in the 1850s and Wesleyan University in 1893, the students, with the agreement of faculty who declared themselves dedicated to ideals of democracy and human character, created honor codes. B. Melendez of Harvard University defined an honor code as a code of academic conduct that includes a written pledge of honesty that students sign, a student controlled judiciary that hears alleged violations, unproctored examinations, and an obligation for all students help enforce the code.

In Canada, individual post-secondary institutions discourage academic misconduct with the help of policies and guidelines published by the university itself, though research into the topic has lagged behind that of other countries. Research has shown that the incidence of academic dishonesty in Canada is similar to that of the United States. While many institutions are guided by ICAI, there also exists provincial organizations, such as the Academic Integrity Council of Ontario (AICO). Handling cases of academic dishonesty was mainly done using the rule compliance approach, which was more punitive in nature. However, more and more institutions are now adopting the integrity approach, which is based on a more educational and restorative model.

=== Mixed judicial boards ===
However, many people doubted the advisability of relying on an abstract notion of honor to prevent academic dishonesty. This doubt has perhaps led to the reality that no more than a quarter of American universities have adopted honor codes. Moreover, many professors could not envisage a student run trial process that treated faculty accusers fairly. In response to these concerns, in the middle of the twentieth century, many schools devised mixed judicial panels composed of both students and faculty. This type of academic integrity system was similar to the traditional faculty control system in that it relied on professors to detect cheating, except in this system cheaters were brought before centralized boards of students and faculty for punishment. By the 1960s over a quarter of American universities had adopted this system of mixed judicial boards.

=== Student due-process rights ===
Starting in the 1960s, the U.S. Supreme Court began chipping away at the in loco parentis doctrine, giving college students more civil liberties such as the right of due process in disciplinary proceedings (Dixon v. Alabama Board of Education, 1961).

=== Modified honor codes ===
Recently, Donald L. McCabe and Linda Klebe Trevino, two experts in the field of academic dishonesty, have proposed a new way of deterring cheating that has been implemented in schools such as the University of Maryland. Modified honor codes put students in charge of the judicial hearing process, making it clear that it is the students' responsibility to stop cheating amongst themselves, but at the same time students still have proctored exams and are not allowed to take pledges of good conduct in place of professor oversight. The researchers who advocate this type of code seem to think that the normal honor code is something of a special case that is not applicable to many schools. According to supporters of this system, schools with a large student body, a weak college community, or no history of student self-governance will not be able to support a full honor code. However, while modified honor codes seem to be more effective than faculty or administration run integrity codes of conduct, research shows that schools with modified codes still have higher rates of cheating than schools with full honor codes.

=== Comparison of different systems of enforcement ===
Research has shown that there is a strong correlation between forms of academic integrity system and levels of cheating at a school. Several studies have found students who attend schools with honor codes are less likely to cheat than students at schools with traditional integrity codes. Another study found that only 28% of schools with honor codes have high levels of cheating, whereas 81% of schools with mixed judicial boards have high rates of cheating. Whereas faculty or administration run codes of conduct tend to rely on policing and punishment to deter students from cheating, honor codes tend to rely on and cultivate student senses of honor and group peer pressure to deter academic misconduct.

=== Faculty issues in deterring academic dishonesty ===
There are limitations to relying on the faculty to police academic dishonesty. One study found that up to 21% of professors have ignored at least one clear cut case of cheating. Another study revealed that 40% of professors "never" report cheating, 54% "seldom" report cheating, and that a mere 6% act on all cases of academic misconduct that confront them. A third survey of professors found that while 79% had observed cheating, only 9% had penalized the student. Another study suggests that plagiarism detection software is rarely used, while university teachers try to detect plagiarism through careful reading. This study also found that different versions of tests are used comparatively infrequently in examinations, for example by trying to ensure sufficient distance between students or by ensuring that enough supervisors are present. According to a manual for professors on cheating,

the reasons for this lack of action include unwillingness to devote time and energy to the issue, reluctance to undergo an emotional confrontation, and fear of retaliation by the student, of losing students, of being accused of harassment or discrimination, and even of being sued for these offenses and/or defamation of character.

Similarly, a survey found that university teachers were less likely to engage in different methods of preventing and detecting academic dishonesty if they rated perceived effort as too high, perceived effectiveness as too low, external expectations that such behaviour should be enforced as too low, or if they did not strongly disapprove of academic dishonesty. Such reasons have been also observed in other studies. There are other reasons as well. Some professors are reluctant to report violations to the appropriate authorities because they believe the punishment to be too harsh. Some professors may have little incentive to reduce cheating in their classes below a point that would otherwise be obvious to outside observers, as they are rated by how many research papers they publish and research grants they win for the college, and not by how well they teach.

Under the ironic gaze of postmodernism, the distinctions between guilt and innocence, integrity and deceit permeating the scandal debates appear irrelevant. However, there is an argument that postmodernism is just moral relativism, therefore cheating is condoned as a valid academic method, even if it is morally and legally wrong. One professor wrote in an article in The English Journal that when he peeked in on an unproctored class taking a test and saw several students up and consulting with one another, he decided that they were not cheating, but were using non-traditional techniques and collaborative learning to surmount the obstacles teachers had put in their way. Issues of cultural relativism also affect professors' views on cheating; the standard objection being that "students from certain Middle Eastern, Asian, and African cultures are baffled by the notion that one can 'own' ideas, since their cultures regard words and ideas as the property of all rather than as individual property". Another issue teachers may have with deterring cheating is that they may decide that it is not their job. The argument that "they're professors, not policemen" is often heard in academia. In economic terms, some professors believe they are being paid to provide learning, and if the student loses that learning through cheating, they are only cheating themselves out of the money they have paid for their education.

== See also ==
- Academic authorship
- Accreditation mill
- Bullying in academia
- Cyril Burt, a professor whose studies of inheritance of intelligence were discredited after evidence emerged indicating he had falsified research data
- Diploma mill
- Intellectual honesty
- Jan Hendrik Schön, who briefly rose to prominence after a series of apparent breakthroughs with semiconductors were later discovered to be fraudulent
- Haruko Obokata, researcher accused of scientific misconduct
- Job fraud
- Research paper mill
- Research Integrity Risk Index
- Scientific misconduct
- Source criticism
- XF (grade)
- Atlanta Public Schools cheating scandal
