= Stages of development =

Stages of development may refer to:

== Biology ==
- Developmental biology, the study of the process by which animals and plants grow and develop
- Prenatal development, also called fetal development, or embryology
- Human development (biology), the process of growing to maturity. In biological terms, this entails growth from a one-celled zygote to an adult human being

== Economics ==
- Economic growth, the increase in the amount of the goods and services produced by an economy over time
- Input-output model, a quantitative economic technique that represents the interdependencies between different branches of a national economy or different regional economies
- IS/LM model, a macroeconomic tool that demonstrates the relationship between interest rates and real output in the goods and services market and the money market
- Rostovian take-off model
- Exogenous growth model
- Endogenous growth theory, holds that economic growth is primarily the result of endogenous and not external forces
- Dual-sector model, a model in developmental economics
- O-Ring theory of economic development, a model of economic development put forward by Michael Kremer, which proposes that tasks of production must be executed proficiently together in order for any of them to be of high value
- Harrod–Domar model, used in development economics to explain an economy's growth rate in terms of the level of saving and productivity of capital
- Kerala model, of development, based on the development experience of the southern Indian state of Kerala, refers to the state's achievement of significant improvements in material conditions of living, reflected in indicators of social development that are comparable to that of many developed countries, even though the state's per capita income is low in comparison to them
- Harris–Todaro model, named after John R
- Romer Model

== Psychology ==
Developmental stage theories / Child development stages – stages of child development

- Erikson's stages of psychosocial development, as articulated by Erik Erikson, explain eight stages through which a healthily developing human should pass from infancy to late adulthood
- Kohlberg's stages of moral development
- Loevinger's stages of ego development, 'conceptualize a theory of ego development that was based on Erikson's psychosocial model', as well as on the works of Harry Stack Sullivan, and in which 'the ego was theorized to mature and evolve through stages across the lifespan as a result of a dynamic interaction between the inner self and the outer environment'
- Piaget's theory of cognitive development, a comprehensive theory about the nature and development of human intelligence, first developed by Jean Piaget
- Neo-Piagetian theories of cognitive development, theory of cognitive development has been criticized on many grounds
- Psychosexual development, a central element of the psychoanalytic sexual drive theory, that human beings, from birth, possess an instinctual libido (sexual energy) that develops in five stages
- Model of hierarchical complexity, a framework for scoring how complex a behavior is
- Maslow's hierarchy of needs, a theory in psychology proposed by Abraham Maslow in his 1943 paper "A Theory of Human Motivation"

== Sociology ==
- Sociocultural evolution (cultural development), and social evolution, describing how cultures and societies have changed over time
- Fowler's stages of faith development, proposed by Professor James W
- Team development
  - Tuckman's stages of group development (forming, storming, norming and performing), model of group development was first proposed by Bruce Tuckman in 1965, who maintained that these phases are all necessary and inevitable in order for the team to grow, to face up to challenges, to tackle problems, to find solutions, to plan work, and to deliver results

== Technology ==
- Software release life cycle, software development stages
