= Flashback (psychology) =

Memory re-experiencing event

A flashback, or involuntary recurrent memory, is a psychological phenomenon in which an individual has a sudden, usually powerful, re-experiencing of a past experience, or elements of a past experience. These experiences can be frightening, happy, sad, exciting, or any number of other emotions. The term is used particularly when the memory is recalled involuntarily, especially when it is so intense that the person "relives" the experience, and is unable to fully recognize it as memory of a past experience and not something that is happening in "real time".

== History ==
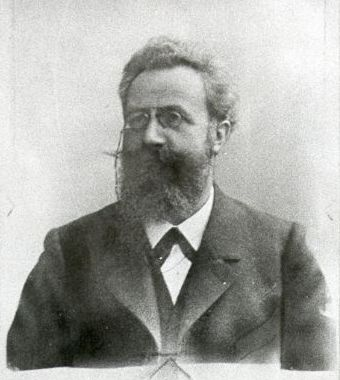
Hermann Ebbinghaus (1850–1909)

Flashbacks are the "personal experiences that pop into your awareness, without any conscious, premeditated attempt to search and retrieve this memory". These experiences occasionally have little to no relation to the situation at hand. For those suffering post-traumatic stress disorder (PTSD), flashbacks can significantly disrupt everyday life.

Memory is divided into voluntary (conscious) and involuntary (unconscious) processes that function independently of each other. Theories and research on memory date back to Hermann Ebbinghaus, who began studying nonsense syllables. Ebbinghaus classified three distinct classes of memory: sensory, short-term, and long-term memory.

- Sensory memory is made up of a brief storage of information within a specific medium (the line you see after waving a sparkler in your field of vision is created by sensory memory).
- Short term memory is made up of the information currently in use to complete the task at hand.
- Long term memory is composed of the systems used to store memory over long periods. It enables one to remember what happened two days ago at noon, or who called last night.

Very little research has been done on flashbacks in the cognitive psychology discipline. However, flashbacks have been studied within a clinical discipline, and they have been identified as symptoms for many disorders, including PTSD. Miller (1962–1974) argued that involuntary memories should not be studied because of their fragility.

== Theory ==
Due to the elusive nature of involuntary recurrent memories, very little is known about the subjective experience of flashbacks. However, theorists agree that this phenomenon is in part due to the manner in which memories of specific events are initially encoded (or entered) into memory, the way in which the memory is organized, and also the way in which the individual later recalls the event. Overall, theories that attempt to explain the flashback phenomenon can be categorized into one of two viewpoints. The "special mechanism" view is clinically oriented in that it holds that involuntary memories are due to traumatic events, and the memories for these events can be attributed to a special memory mechanism. On the other hand, the "basic mechanism" view is more experimentally oriented in that it is based on memory research. This view holds that traumatic memories are bound by the same parameters as all other every-day memories. Both viewpoints agree that involuntary recurrent memories result from rare events that would not normally occur.

These rare events elicit strong emotional reactions from the individual, since they violate normal expectations. According to the special mechanism view, the event would lead to fragmented voluntary encoding into memory, thus making the conscious subsequent retrieval of the memory much more difficult. On the other hand, involuntary recurrent memories are likely to become more available, and these are more likely to be triggered by external cues. In contrast to this, the basic mechanism view holds that the traumatic event would lead to enhanced and cohesive encoding of the event in memory, and this would make both voluntary and involuntary memories more available for subsequent recall.

What is currently an issue of controversy is the nature of the defining criteria that make up an involuntary memory. Up until recently, researchers believed that involuntary memories were a result of traumatic incidents that the individual experienced at a specific time and place, while losing all the temporal and spatial features of the event during an involuntary recollection episode. In other words, people who suffer from flashbacks lose all sense of time and place, and they feel as if they are re-experiencing the event instead of just recalling a memory. This is consistent with the special mechanism viewpoint in that the involuntary memory is based on a different memory mechanism compared to the voluntary counterpart. Furthermore, the initial emotions experienced at the time of encoding are also re-experienced during a flashback episode, which can be especially distressing when the memory is of a traumatic event. It has also been demonstrated that the nature of the flashbacks experienced by an individual are static in that they retain an identical form upon each intrusion. This occurs even when the individual has learned new information that directly contradicts the information retained in the intrusive memory.

Upon further investigation, it was found that involuntary memories are usually derived from either stimuli that indicated the onset of a traumatic event, or from stimuli that hold intense emotional significance to the individual simply because they were closely associated with the trauma during the time of the event. These stimuli then become warning signals that, if encountered again, serve to trigger a flashback. This has been termed the warning signal hypothesis. For example, a person may experience a flashback while seeing sun spots on their lawn. This happens because they associate the spots with the headlights of the vehicle that they saw before being involved in a car accident. According to Ehlers and Clark, traumatic memories are more apt to induce flashbacks because of faulty encoding that cause the individual to fail in taking contextual information into account, as well as time and place information that would usually be associated with everyday memories. These individuals become sensitized to stimuli that they associate with the traumatic event, which then serve as triggers for a flashback, even if the context surrounding the stimulus may be unrelated. These triggers may elicit an adaptive response during the time of the traumatic experience, but they soon become maladaptive if the person continues to respond in the same way to situations in which no danger may be present.

The special mechanism viewpoint further adds to this by suggesting that these triggers activate the fragmented memory of the traumatic event, while the protective cognitive mechanisms function to inhibit the recall of the original memory. Dual representation theory enhances this idea by suggesting two separate mechanisms that account for voluntary and involuntary memories. The first of which is called the verbally accessible memory system and the latter of which is referred as the situationally accessible memory system.

In contrast to this, theories belonging to the basic mechanism viewpoint hold that there are no separate mechanisms that account for voluntary and involuntary memories. The recall of memories for stressful events do not differ under involuntary and voluntary recall. Instead, it is the retrieval mechanism that is different for each type of recall. In involuntary recall, the external trigger creates an uncontrolled spreading of activation in memory, whereas in voluntary recall, this activation is strictly controlled and is goal-oriented.

In addition, the basic mechanism’s involuntary recall for negative events, are also associated with memories of positive events. Studies have shown that out of the participants who suffer from flashbacks, about 5 percent of them experience positive non-traumatic flashbacks. They experience the same intensity level and has the same retrieval mechanism as the people who experienced negative and/or traumatic flashbacks, which includes the vividness and the emotion related to the involuntary memory. The only difference is whether the emotion evoked is positive or negative.

== Cognition ==
=== Sensory memory ===
Memory has typically been divided into sensory, short-term, and long-term processes. The items that are seen, or other sensory details related to an intense intrusive memory, may cause flashbacks. These sensory experiences take place just before the flashback event. They act as a conditioning stimulus for the event to appear as an involuntary memory. The presence of the primer increases the likelihood of the appearance of a flashback. Just as the sensory memory can result in this, it can also help erase the connections between the memory and the primer. Counter conditioning and rewriting the memory of the events that are related to the sensory cue may help dissociate the memory from the primer.

=== Short-term memory/working memory ===
There have been many suspicions that disruptive memories may cause deficiencies in short term memories. For people who suffer from flashbacks, the hippocampus that is involved with the working memory has been damaged, supporting the theory that the working memory could have also been affected. Many studies were conducted to test this theory and all results concluded that intrusive memory does not affect the short-term memory or the working memory.

=== Long-term memory ===
Out of the three types of memory processes, long-term memory contains the greatest amount of memory storage and is involved in most of the cognitive processes. According to Rasmuseen and Berntsen, "long-term memory processes may form the core of spontaneous thought" (2009). Thus, the memory process most related to flashbacks is long term memory. Additionally, other 2009 studies by Rasmuseen and Berntsen have shown that long term memory is also susceptible to extraneous factors such as recency effect, arousal, and rehearsal as it pertains to accessibility. Compared to voluntary memories, involuntary memories show shorter retrieval times and little cognitive effort. Finally, involuntary memories arise due to automatic processing, which does not rely on higher-order cognitive monitoring, or executive control processing. Normally, voluntary memory would be associated with contextual information, allowing correspondence between time and place to happen. This is not true for flashbacks. According to Brewin, Lanius et, al, flashbacks, are disconnected from contextual information, and as a result are disconnected from time and place (2009).

=== Episodic memory ===
Episodic memory is a type of long-term memory where the involuntary memories are made up of intense autobiographical memories. As a version of declarative memory, this follows the same idea that the more personal the memory is, the more likely it will be remembered. Disruptive memories are almost always associated with a familiar stimulus that quickly becomes stronger through the process of memory consolidation and reconsolidation. The major difference is that intrusive thoughts are harder to forget. Most mental narratives tends to have varying levels of some type of emotions involved with the memory. For flashbacks, most of the emotions associated with it are negative, though it could be positive as well. These emotions are intense and makes the memory more vivid. Decreasing the intensity of the emotion associated with an intrusive memory may reduce the memory to a calmer episodic memory.

== Neuroscience ==
=== Anatomy ===
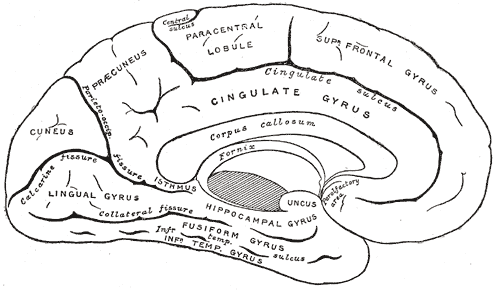
Mid sagittal cut of human brain

The hippocampus is highlighted in red.

Several brain regions have been implicated in the neurological basis of flashbacks. The medial temporal lobes, the precuneus, the posterior cingulate gyrus and the prefrontal cortex are the most typically referenced with regards to involuntary memories.

The medial temporal lobes are commonly associated with memory. More specifically, the lobes have been linked to episodic/declarative memory, which means the damage to these areas of the brain would result in disruptions to declarative memory system. The hippocampus, located within the medial temporal regions, has also been highly related to memory processes. There are numerous functions in the hippocampus that includes aspects of memory consolidation. Brain imaging studies have shown flashbacks activating areas associated with memory retrieval. The precuneus, located in the superior parietal lobe, and the posterior cingulate gyrus, have also been implicated in memory retrieval. In addition, studies have shown activity in areas of the prefrontal cortex to be involved in memory retrieval.

Thus, the medial temporal lobe, precuneus, superior parietal lobe and posterior cingulate gyrus have all been implicated in flashbacks in accordance to their roles on memory retrieval.

=== Clinical investigations ===
To date, the specific causes of flashbacks have not yet been confirmed. Several studies have proposed various potential factors. Psychiatrists suggest that temporal lobe seizures may also have some relation.

Conversely, several ideas have been discounted in terms of being a possible cause to flashbacks. Tym et al., 2009, suggest this list includes medication or other substances, Charles Bonnet syndrome, delayed palinopsia, hallucinations, dissociative phenomena, and depersonalization syndrome.

A study of the persistence of traumatic memories in World War II prisoners of war, investigates via the administration of surveys, the extent and severity of flashbacks that occur in prisoners of war. This study concluded that the persistence of severely traumatic autobiographical memories can last up to 65 years. Until recently, the study of flashbacks has been limited to participants who already experience flashbacks, such as those suffering from PTSD, restricting researchers to observational/exploratory rather than experimental studies.

There have also been treatments based on theories about the inner workings of the involuntary memory. The procedure involves changing the content of the intrusive memories and restructuring it so the negative connotations associated with it is erased. The patients are encouraged to live their lives and not focus on their disruptive memories, and are taught to recognize any stimulus that may start the flashbacks. The events related to the flashbacks still mostly exist in their mind, but the meaning and the way the person perceives it is now different. According to Ehlers, this method has a high success rate with patients who have suffered from trauma.

=== Neuroimaging investigations ===
Neuroimaging techniques have been applied to the investigation of flashbacks. Using these techniques, researchers attempt to discover the structural and functional differences in the anatomy of the brain in individuals who suffer from flashbacks compared to those who do not. Neuroimaging involves a cluster of techniques, including computerized tomography, positron emission tomography, magnetic resonance imaging (including functional), as well as magnetoencephalography. Neuroimaging studies investigating flashbacks are based on current psychological theories that are used as the foundation for the research. One of theories that is consistently investigated is the difference between explicit and implicit memory. This distinction dictates the manner in which memories are later recalled, namely either consciously (voluntarily) or unconsciously (involuntarily).

These methods have largely relied on subtractive reasoning, in which the participant first voluntarily recalls a memory before recalling the memory again through involuntary means. Involuntary memories (or flashbacks) are elicited in the participant by reading an emotionally charged script to them that is designed to trigger a flashback in individuals who suffer from PTSD. The investigators record the regions of the brain that are active during each of these conditions, and then subtract the activity. Whatever is left is assumed to underpin the neurological differences between the conditions.

Imaging studies looking at patients with PTSD as they undergo flashback experiences have identified elevated activation in regions of the dorsal stream including the mid-occipital lobe, primary motor cortex, and supplementary motor area. The dorsal stream is involved in sensory processing, and therefore these activations might underlie the vivid visual experiences associated with flashbacks. The study also found reduced activation in regions such as the inferior temporal cortex and parahippocampus which are involved in processing allocentric relations. These deactivations might contribute to feelings of dissociation from reality during flashback experiences.

=== Relations to mental illness and drug use ===
Flashbacks are often associated with mental illness as they are a symptom and a feature in diagnostic criteria for PTSD, acute stress disorder, and obsessive-compulsive disorder (OCD). Flashbacks have also been observed in people suffering from bipolar disorder, depression, homesickness, near-death experiences, epileptic seizures, and substance abuse.

Some researchers have suggested that the use of some drugs can cause a person to experience flashbacks. Users of LSD sometimes report "acid flashbacks." The effect of certain drugs on flashbacks may involve a variety of factors. For example, a study on the use of the Nabilone for the treatment of nightmares in PTSD patients found that, in some cases, the use of the synthetic cannabinoid reduced daytime flashbacks. However another study found subjects previously exposed to cannabinoids (non-synthetic), could experience cannabinoid "flashbacks" when THC stored in fat cells re-enters the bloodstream through lipolysis.

== Culture ==
The psychological phenomenon has frequently been portrayed narratively in film and television. Some of the most accurate media portrayals of psychological flashbacks have been those related to wartime, and the association of flashbacks to PTSD caused by the traumas and stresses of war. One of the earliest screen portrayals of this is in the 1945 film Mildred Pierce.

== See also ==
- Hallucinogen persisting perception disorder
