= Dual representation (disambiguation) =

Dual representation is a concept in math.

Dual representation may also refer to:

- Dual representation (psychology), a concept in psychology and child development
- Dual representation theory, a theory related to Post Traumatic Stress Disorder
- Dual representation (law), a legal concept
