= Heinz dilemma =

Ethical thought experiment

The Heinz dilemma is a frequently used example in many ethics and morality classes. One well-known version of the dilemma, used in Lawrence Kohlberg's stages of moral development, is stated as follows:

A woman was on her deathbed. There was one drug that the doctors said would save her. It was a form of radium that a druggist in the same town had recently discovered. The drug was expensive to make, but the druggist was charging ten times what the drug cost him to produce. He paid $200 for the radium and charged $2,000 for a small dose of the drug. The sick woman's husband, Heinz, went to everyone he knew to borrow the money, but he could only get together about $1,000 which is half of what it cost. He told the druggist that his wife was dying and asked him to sell it cheaper or let him pay later. But the druggist said: “No, I discovered the drug and I'm going to make money from it.” So Heinz got desperate and broke into the man's laboratory to steal the drug for his wife. Should Heinz have broken into the laboratory to steal the drug for his wife? Why or why not?

From a theoretical point of view, it is not important what the participant thinks that Heinz should do. Kohlberg's theory holds that the justification the participant offers is what is significant, the form of their response. Below are some of many examples of possible arguments that belong to the six stages:

#	Level	Stage	Heinz should steal the drug, because	Heinz should not steal the drug, because
1	Pre-Conventional	Obedience	It is only worth $200 and not how much the druggist wanted for it; Heinz had even offered to pay for it and was not stealing anything else.	He will consequently be put in prison which will mean he is a bad person.
1	Pre-Conventional	Self-interest	He will be much happier if he saves his wife, even if he has to serve a prison sentence.	Prison is an awful place, and he would more likely languish in a jail cell than over his wife's death.
2	Conventional	Conformity	His wife expects it; he wants to be a good husband.	Stealing is bad and he is not a criminal; he has tried to do everything he can without breaking the law, you cannot blame him.
2	Conventional	Law-and-order	His wife will benefit, but he should also take the prescribed punishment for the crime as well as paying the druggist what he is owed. Criminals cannot just run around without regard for the law; actions have consequences.	The law prohibits stealing.
3	Post-Conventional	Social contract orientation	Everyone has a right to choose life, regardless of the law.	The scientist has a right to fair compensation. Even if his wife is sick, it does not make his actions right.
3	Post-Conventional	Universal human ethics	Saving a human life is a more fundamental value than the property rights of another person.	Others may need the medicine just as badly, and their lives are equally significant.
