= James W. Fowler =

American scholar of religion

The Reverend James W. Fowler
- Born: James William Fowler III; October 12, 1940; Reidsville, North Carolina, US
- Died: October 16, 2015 (aged 75)
- Spouse: Lurline Fowler

Ecclesiastical career
- Religion: Christianity (Methodist)
- Church: United Methodist Church

Academic background
- Education: Duke University; Drew University; Harvard University
- Thesis: The Development and Expression of "the Conviction of the Sovereignty of God" in H. Richard Niebuhr's Thought (1971)
- Influences: Erik Erikson; Immanuel Kant; H. Richard Niebuhr; Paul Tillich; Nicolas Restif de la Bretonne

Academic work
- Discipline: Religious studies; theology
- Sub-discipline: Psychology of religion
- Institutions: Emory University
- Notable works: Stages of Faith (1981)
- Notable ideas: Stages of faith development

James William Fowler III (1940–2015) was an American theologian who was Professor of Theology and Human Development at Emory University. He served as director of both the Center for Research on Faith and Moral Development and the Center for Ethics until he retired in 2005. He was a minister in the United Methodist Church. Fowler is best known for his book Stages of Faith, published in 1981, in which he sought to develop the idea of a developmental process in "human faith".

== Life and career ==
Fowler was born in Reidsville, North Carolina, on October 12, 1940, the son of a Methodist minister. In 1977, Fowler was appointed Associate Professor of Theology and Human Development at the Candler School of Theology at Emory University. He was later named Charles Howard Candler Professor of Theology and Human Development. He died on October 16, 2015.

== Stages of faith ==
He is best known for his book Stages of Faith (1981), in which he sought to develop the idea of a developmental process in "human faith".

These stages of faith development were along the lines of Jean Piaget's theory of cognitive development and Lawrence Kohlberg's stages of moral development.

In the book, Fowler describes 6 stages of development as shown in the table below:

Stage	Fowler	Age in Years	Piaget	Description
0	Undifferentiated; Faith	0 - 2	Sensoric-motorical	"Undifferentiated" faith (birth to 2 years), is characterized by an early learning of the safety of their environment (i.e., warm, safe, and secure vs. hurt, neglect, and abuse). If consistent nurture is experienced, one will develop a sense of trust and safety about the universe and the divine. Conversely, negative experiences can lead to distrust of the universe and the divine. Transition to the next stage begins with the integration of thought and language, which facilitates the use of symbols in speech and play.
1	Intuitive- Projective	2 - 7	Pre-operational	"Intuitive-Projective" faith (ages of three to seven), is characterized by the psyche's unprotected exposure to the Unconscious, and marked by a relative fluidity of thought patterns. Religion is learned mainly through experiences, stories, images, and the people that one comes in contact with.
2	Mythic- Literal	7 - 12	Concrete operational	"Mythic-Literal" faith (mostly in school children), is characterized by persons have a strong belief in the justice and reciprocity of the universe, and their deities are almost always anthropomorphic. During this time, metaphors and symbolic language are often misunderstood and are taken literally.
3	Synthetic- Conventional	12 - 21	Formal-operational	"Synthetic-Conventional" faith (arising in adolescence; aged 12 to adulthood), is characterized by conformity to authority and the religious development of a personal identity. Any conflicts with one's beliefs are ignored at this stage due to fear of threats posed by inconsistencies.
4	Individuative-Reflective	21 - 35	Formal-operational	"Individuative-Reflective" faith (usually mid-twenties to late thirties), is a stage of angst and struggle. The individual takes personal responsibility for their beliefs and feelings. As one reflects on one's own beliefs, there is an openness to a new complexity of faith, but this also heightens the awareness of conflicts in one's beliefs.
5	Conjunctive	35 - 45	Formal-operational	"Conjunctive" faith (mid-life crisis), acknowledges paradox and transcendence relating reality behind the symbols of inherited systems. The individual resolves conflicts from previous stages through a complex understanding of a multidimensional, interdependent "truth" that cannot be explained by any particular statement.
6	Universalizing	45 -	Formal-operational	"Universalizing" faith. The individual would treat any person with compassion, as they view people as from a universal community, and should be treated with universal principles of love and justice.

== Empirical research ==
Fowler's model has inspired a considerable body of empirical research on faith development, although little of such research was ever conducted by Fowler himself. A useful tool here has been Gary Leak's Faith Development Scale, or FDS, which has been subject to factor analysis by Leak. In 2003, Timothy Paul Jones developed the Fowlerian Stage-Development Survey (FSDS) and argued that Fowler’s stages of faith do not correlate positively with evangelicals' self-perceived faith development. For further discussion of empirical assessments of faith development, see Developmental approaches to religion.

== Publications ==
- Stages of Faith: The Psychology of Human Development and the Quest for Meaning (1981) ISBN 0-06-062866-9
- Becoming Adult, Becoming Christian: Adult Development and Christian Faith (1984) (revised 1999 ISBN 0-7879-5134-X)
- To See the Kingdom: The Theological Vision of H. Richard Niebuhr (1974), ISBN 978-0-687-42300-2
- Faith Development and Pastoral Care (1987) ISBN 0-8006-1739-8
- Weaving the New Creation: Stages of Faith and the Public Church (1991) ISBN 0-06-062845-6
- Faithful Change: The Personal and Public Challenges of Postmodern Life (1996) ISBN 978-0-687-01730-0

== See also ==
- Jean Piaget, Theory of cognitive development
- Erik Erikson, Erikson's stages of psychosocial development
- Lawrence Kohlberg, Kohlberg's stages of moral development
- Developmental psychology
  - Developmental stage theories
- Psychology of religion
- Integral theory (Ken Wilber)

== Bibliography ==
- Downs, Perry G. (1994). Teaching for Spiritual Growth: An Introduction to Christian Education. Grand Rapids, Michigan: Zondervan Publishing House. ISBN 978-0-310-59370-6.
- Evans, Nancy; Forney, Deanna; Guido, Florence; Patton, Lori; Renn, Kristen (2010). Student Development in College: Theory, Research, and Practice (2nd ed.). San Francisco, California: Jossey-Bass. ISBN 978-0-7879-7809-9.
- Fowler, James W. (1986). "Stages of Faith". In Wolski Conn, Joann (ed.). Women's Spirituality: Resources for Christian Development. New York: Paulist Press. pp. 342–48.
- Leak, Gary K. (2008). "Factorial Validity of the Faith Development Scale". The International Journal for the Psychology of Religion. 18 (2): 123–131. doi:10.1080/10508610701879399. ISSN 1532-7582. S2CID 143819966.
- Osmer, Richard; Bridgers, Lynn (2018) [2015]. "James Fowler". Christian Educators of the 20th Century. La Mirada, California: Biola University.

Awards
Preceded by Paul R. Fleischman	Oskar Pfister Award; 1994	Succeeded by Prakash Desai
