= James Rest =

James Rest was an American psychologist specializing in moral psychology and development. Together with his Minnesota Group of colleagues, including Darcia Narvaez, Muriel Bebeau, and Stephen Thoma, Rest extended Kohlberg's approach to researching moral reasoning.

James Rest was a professor at the University of Minnesota from 1970 until his formal retirement in 1994 and was a 1993 recipient of the Distinguished Teaching Award at the university. Rest continued mentoring, researching, and writing until his death in 1999.

Rest's and the Neo-Kohlbergians' work included the Defining Issues Test (DIT), which attempts to provide an objective measure of moral development, and the Four Component Model of moral development, which attempts to provide a theoretical perspective on the subject. Rest and the Minnesota Group were unusually open to other approaches, new research, criticisms, and integrating their Neo-Kohlbergian approach with others.

Rest was previously married to Minnesota politician Ann Rest.

== Reception ==
Rest's work in general and the DIT in particular became the focus of significant scholarly research. Testing by independent sources has tended to uphold the strength and validity of the test.

The 4 component model of James Rest involves 4 psychological processes:

1. Moral sensitivity - the individual must be able to interpret a particular situation in terms of possible courses of action, determine who could be affected by the action, and understand how the affected party would regard the effect
2. Moral judgement - the individual must be able to judge which action is right and ought to decide what to do in a particular situation.
3. Moral motivation - the individual must be able to choose moral values over personal values
4. Moral character - the individual must have sufficient ego, strength and implementation skills to follow his or her intentions.

== See also ==
- Defining Issues Test
- Kohlberg's stages of moral development
