= S. Walter Poulshock =

American historian (1929–1997)

S. Walter Poulshock (February 19, 1929 – February 3, 1997) was an American historian and psychotherapist.

As an assistant professor at Rutgers University, Poulshock resigned his position after it was discovered that his 1965 book The Two Parties and the Tariff in the 1880s, among other work, was based on fabricated quotes. The case has been described as one of the most notable examples of academic fraud in American historical research prior to the more widely publicized Arming America case.

Poulshock subsequently retrained as a psychotherapist, and practiced in this field until his death in 1997.

== Career as historian ==
Poulshock studied for a PhD at the University of Pennsylvania, specialising in politics of the 1880s, and graduated in 1962. He then adapted his thesis into a book, published by Syracuse University Press.

Poulshock received an appointment as an assistant professor at Rutgers and the book initially received some favourable attention. However, reviewer Jerome L. Sternstein (who wrote two articles on the case in 2002) and others came to realise that many quotes were from letters that did not exist. In addition, it emerged that Poulshock had never been to a department of the Library of Congress where he claimed to have carried out much of his research.

Poulshock was reportedly challenged by a meeting of Rutgers faculty, where he confessed and agreed to leave.

== Aftermath ==
The Two Parties and the Tariff in the 1880s was initially withdrawn under the justification of "technical issues." A rush of buying copies took place as historians aware of the real facts sought to quickly buy copies for their own examination or as souvenirs before the book was withdrawn.

The University of Pennsylvania declined to provide a comment on the topic to its student newspaper, leading the paper to publish both a news article and an opinion piece in April 1966 on the topic in protest.

In July 1966 the American Historical Review stated that the book was based "confessedly in part upon evidence which does not exist, has been withdrawn as far as possible from circulation, and anyone attempting to use it should be advised of this."

Sternstein wrote in 2002 that he was concerned that the case had not been sufficiently publicised, meaning that Poulshock's work continued to be cited by historians unaware that it was fraudulent, and it had never been removed from the shelves of many university libraries. This concern has also been raised since. Indeed, his book and thesis have continued to be occasionally cited, as recently as 2013.

== Sociologist ==
Poulshock received another doctorate from the University of Pennsylvania in 1978, this time in sociology. He moved to Ohio, where he served as director of program management for the Windsor Behavioral Health Network.

== See also ==
- Arming America
- Stephen Ambrose
- Stephen Glass
- Doris Kearns Goodwin
