= Lawrence Kohlberg's stages of moral development =

Psychological theory describing the evolution of moral reasoning

Lawrence Kohlberg's theory about the stages of moral development is an adaptation of a psychological theory originally conceived by the Swiss psychologist Jean Piaget. Kohlberg began his work on this subject as a psychology graduate student at the University of Chicago in 1958, and expanded upon the theory throughout his life.

The theory holds that moral reasoning, a necessary (but not sufficient) condition for ethical behavior, has six developmental stages, each more adequate at responding to moral dilemmas than its predecessor. Kohlberg followed the development of moral judgment far beyond the ages studied earlier by Piaget, who also claimed that logic and morality develop through constructive stages. Expanding on Piaget's work, Kohlberg determined that the process of moral development was principally concerned with justice and that it continued throughout the individual's life, a notion that led to dialogue on the philosophical implications of such research.

The six stages of moral development occur in phases of pre-conventional, conventional and post-conventional morality. For his studies, Kohlberg relied on stories such as the Heinz dilemma and was interested in how individuals would justify their actions if placed in similar moral dilemmas. He analyzed the form of moral reasoning displayed, rather than its conclusion and classified it into one of six stages.

There have been critiques of the theory from several perspectives. Arguments have been made that it emphasizes justice to the exclusion of other moral values, such as caring; that there is such an overlap between stages that they should more properly be regarded as domains; and that evaluations of the reasons for moral choices are mostly post hoc rationalizations (by both decision makers and psychologists) of intuitive decisions.

A new field within psychology was created by Kohlberg's theory, and according to Haggbloom et al.'s study of the most eminent psychologists of the 20th century, Kohlberg was the 16th most frequently cited in introductory psychology textbooks throughout the century, as well as the 30th most eminent. Kohlberg's scale is about how people justify behaviors and his stages are not a method of ranking how moral someone's behavior is; there should be a correlation between how someone scores on the scale and how they behave. The general hypothesis is that moral behaviour is more responsible, consistent and predictable from people at higher levels.

== Stages ==
Kohlberg's six stages can be more generally grouped into three levels of two stages each: pre-conventional, conventional and post-conventional. Following Piaget's constructivist requirements for a stage model, as described in his theory of cognitive development, it is extremely rare to regress in stages—to lose the use of higher stage abilities. Stages cannot be skipped; each provides a new and necessary perspective, more comprehensive and differentiated than its predecessors but integrated with them.

Kohlberg's Model of Moral Development

Level 1 (Pre-Conventional)

1. Obedience and punishment orientation

(How can I avoid punishment?)

2. Self-interest orientation

(What's in it for me?)
(Paying for a benefit)

Level 2 (Conventional)

3. Interpersonal accord and conformity

(Social norms)
(The good boy/girl attitude)

4. Authority and social-order maintaining orientation

(Law and order morality)

Level 3 (Post-Conventional)

5. Social contract orientation
6. Universal ethical principles

(Principled conscience)

The understanding gained in each stage is retained in later stages, but may be regarded by those in later stages as simplistic, lacking in sufficient attention to detail.

=== Pre-conventional ===
The pre-conventional level of moral reasoning is especially common in children and is expected to occur in animals, although adults can also exhibit this level of reasoning. Reasoners at this level judge the morality of an action by its direct consequences. The pre-conventional level consists of the first and second stages of moral development and is solely concerned with the self in an egocentric manner. A child with pre-conventional morality has not yet adopted or internalized society's conventions regarding what is right or wrong but instead focuses largely on external consequences that certain actions may bring.

In Stage one (obedience- and punishment-driven), individuals focus on the direct consequences of their actions on themselves. For example, an action is perceived as morally wrong because the perpetrator is punished. "The last time I did that I got spanked, so I will not do it again." The worse the punishment for the act is, the more "bad" the act is perceived to be. This can give rise to an inference that even innocent victims are guilty in proportion to their suffering. It is "egocentric", lacking recognition that others' points of view are different from one's own. There is "deference to superior power or prestige".

An example of obedience- and punishment-driven morality would be a child refusing to do something because it is wrong and that the consequences could result in punishment. For example, a child's classmate tries to dare the child to skip school. The child would apply obedience- and punishment-driven morality by refusing to skip school because he would get punished.

Stage two (self-interest-driven) expresses the "what's in it for me" position, in which right behavior is defined by whatever the individual believes to be in their best interest, or whatever is "convenient," but understood in a narrow way which does not consider one's reputation or relationships to groups of people. Stage two reasoning shows a limited interest in the needs of others, but only to a point where it might further the individual's own interests. As a result, concern for others is not based on loyalty or intrinsic respect, but rather a "You scratch my back, and I'll scratch yours" mentality, which is commonly described as quid pro quo, a Latin term that means doing or giving something in order to get something in return. The lack of a societal perspective in the pre-conventional level is quite different from the social contract (stage five), as all actions at this stage have the purpose of serving the individual's own needs or interests. For the stage two theorist, the world's perspective is often seen as morally relative. See also: reciprocal altruism.

=== Conventional ===
The conventional level of moral reasoning is typical of adolescents and adults. To reason in a conventional way is to judge the morality of actions by comparing them to society's views and expectations. The conventional level consists of the third and fourth stages of moral development. Conventional morality is characterized by an acceptance of society's conventions concerning right and wrong. At this level an individual obeys rules and follows society's norms even when there are no consequences for obedience or disobedience. Adherence to rules and conventions is somewhat rigid, however, and a rule's appropriateness or fairness is seldom questioned.

In Stage three (good intentions as determined by social consensus), the self enters society by conforming to social standards. Individuals are receptive to approval or disapproval from others as it reflects society's views. They try to be a "good boy" or "good girl" to live up to these expectations, having learned that being regarded as good benefits the self. Stage three reasoning may judge the morality of an action by evaluating its consequences in terms of a person's relationships, which now begin to include things like respect, gratitude, and the "golden rule". "I want to be liked and thought well of; apparently, not being naughty makes people like me." Conforming to the rules for one's social role is not yet fully understood. The intentions of actors play a more significant role in reasoning at this stage; one may feel more forgiving if one thinks that "they mean well".

In Stage four (authority and social order obedience driven), it is important to obey laws, dicta, and social conventions because of their importance in maintaining a functioning society. Moral reasoning in stage four is thus beyond the need for individual approval exhibited in stage three. A central ideal or ideals often prescribe what is right and wrong. If one person violates a law, perhaps everyone would—thus there is an obligation and a duty to uphold laws and rules. When someone does violate a law, it is morally wrong; culpability is thus a significant factor in this stage as it separates the bad domains from the good ones. Most active members of society remain at stage four, where morality is still predominantly dictated by an outside force.

=== Post-conventional ===
The post-conventional level, also known as the principled level, is marked by a growing realization that individuals are separate entities from society, and that the individual's own perspective may take precedence over society's view; individuals may disobey rules inconsistent with their own principles. Post-conventional moralists live by their own ethical principles—principles that typically include such basic human rights as life, liberty, and justice. People who exhibit post-conventional morality view rules as useful but changeable mechanisms—ideally rules can maintain the general social order and protect human rights. Rules are not absolute dictates that must be obeyed without question. Because post-conventional individuals elevate their own moral evaluation of a situation over social conventions, their behavior, especially at stage six, can be confused with that of those at the pre-conventional level.

Kohlberg has speculated that many people may never reach this level of abstract moral reasoning.

In Stage five (social contract driven), the world is viewed as holding different opinions, rights, and values. Such perspectives should be mutually respected as unique to each person or community. Laws are regarded as social contracts rather than rigid edicts. Those that do not promote the general welfare should be changed when necessary to/that meet "the greatest good for the greatest number of people". This is achieved through majority decision and inevitable compromise. Democratic government is ostensibly based on stage five reasoning.

In Stage six (universal ethical principles driven), moral reasoning is based on abstract reasoning using universal ethical principles. Laws are valid only insofar as they are grounded in justice, and a commitment to justice carries with it an obligation to disobey unjust laws. Legal rights are unnecessary, as social contracts are not essential for deontic moral action. Decisions are not reached hypothetically in a conditional way but rather categorically in an absolute way, as in the philosophy of Immanuel Kant. This involves an individual imagining what they would do in another's shoes, if they believed what that other person imagines to be true. The resulting consensus is the action taken.

In this way, action is never merely a means to an end, but an end in itself: the individual acts because it is right to do so—not to avoid punishment, serve personal interest, meet expectations, comply with the law, or honor prior agreements. Although Kohlberg insisted that stage six exists, he found it difficult to identify individuals who consistently operated at that level. Touro College Researcher Arthur P. Sullivan helped support the accuracy of Kohlberg's first five stages through data analysis, but could not provide statistical evidence for the existence of Kohlberg's sixth stage. Therefore, it is difficult to define/recognize as a concrete stage in moral development.

=== Further stages ===
In his empirical studies of individuals throughout their life, Kohlberg observed that some had apparently undergone moral stage regression. This could be resolved either by allowing for moral regression or by extending the theory. Kohlberg chose the latter, postulating the existence of sub-stages in which the emerging stage has not yet been fully integrated into the personality. In particular Kohlberg noted a stage 4½ or 4+, a transition from stage four to five, that shared characteristics of both.

In this stage the individual is disaffected with the arbitrary nature of law and order reasoning; culpability is frequently turned from being defined by society to viewing society itself as culpable. This stage is often mistaken for the moral relativism of stage two, as the individual views those interests of society that conflict with their own as being relatively and morally wrong. Kohlberg noted that this was often observed in students entering college.

Kohlberg suggested that there may be a seventh stage—Transcendental Morality, or Morality of Cosmic Orientation—which linked religion with moral reasoning. Kohlberg's difficulties in obtaining empirical evidence for even a sixth stage, however, led him to emphasize the speculative nature of his seventh stage.

== Theoretical assumptions (philosophy) ==
Kohlberg's stages of moral development are based on the assumption that humans are inherently communicative, capable of reason and possess a desire to understand others and the world around them. The stages of this model relate to the qualitative moral reasonings adopted by individuals and do not translate directly into praise or blame of any individual's actions or character. Arguing that his theory measures moral reasoning and not particular moral conclusions, Kohlberg insists that the form and structure of moral arguments is independent of the content of those arguments, a position he calls "formalism".

Kohlberg's theory follows the notion that justice is the essential characteristic of moral reasoning. Justice itself relies heavily upon the notion of sound reasoning based on principles. Despite being a justice-centered theory of morality, Kohlberg considered it to be compatible with plausible formulations of deontology and eudaimonia.

Kohlberg's theory understands values as a critical component of "the right". Whatever the right is, for Kohlberg, it must be universally valid among societies (a position known as "moral universalism"): there can be no relativism. Morals are not natural features of the world; they are prescriptive. Nevertheless, moral judgments can be evaluated in logical terms of truth and falsity.

According to Kohlberg, someone progressing to a higher stage of moral reasoning cannot skip stages. For example, an individual cannot jump from being concerned mostly with peer judgments (stage three) to being a proponent of social contracts (stage five). On encountering a moral dilemma and finding their current level of moral reasoning unsatisfactory, an individual will look to the next level. Realizing the limitations of the current stage of thinking is the driving force behind moral development, as each progressive stage is more adequate than the last. The process is therefore considered to be constructive, as it is initiated by the conscious construction of the individual and is not in any meaningful sense a component of the individual's innate dispositions or a result of past inductions.

=== Formal elements ===

Progress through Kohlberg's stages happens due to the individual's increasing competence, psychologically and in balancing conflicting social-value claims. The process of resolving conflicting claims to reach an equilibrium is called "justice operation." Kohlberg identifies two of these justice operations: "equality," which involves impartial regard for persons, and "reciprocity", which means regard for the role of personal merit. For Kohlberg, the most adequate result of both operations is "reversibility," in which a moral or dutiful act within a particular situation is evaluated in terms of whether or not the act would be satisfactory even if particular persons were to switch roles within that situation, also known colloquially as "moral musical chairs".

Knowledge and learning contribute to moral development. Specifically important are the individual's "view of persons" and their "social perspective level", each of which becomes more complex and mature with each advancing stage. The "view of persons" can be understood as the individual's grasp of the psychology of other persons; it may be pictured as a spectrum, with stage one having no view of other persons at all, and stage six being entirely socio-centric. The social perspective level involves the understanding of the social universe, differing from the view of persons in that it involves an appreciation of social norms.

== Examples of applied moral dilemmas ==
Kohlberg established the Moral Judgement Interview in his original 1958 dissertation. During the roughly 45-minute tape recorded semi-structured interview, the interviewer uses moral dilemmas to determine which stage of moral reasoning a person uses. The dilemmas are fictional short stories that describe situations in which a person has to make a moral decision. The participant is asked a systemic series of open-ended questions, like what they think the right course of action is, as well as justifications as to why certain actions are right or wrong. The form and structure of these replies are scored and not the content; over a set of multiple moral dilemmas an overall score is derived.

A dilemma that Kohlberg used in his original research was the druggist's dilemma: Heinz Steals the Drug In Europe. Other stories on moral dilemma that Kohlberg used in his research were about two young men trying to skip town, both steal money to leave town but the question then becomes whose crime was worse out of the two. A boy, Joe, saving up money for camp and must decide whether to use his money for camp or give it to his father who wants to use the money to go on a trip with his friends. And a story about Judy and Louise, two sisters, and whether Louise should tell their mother the truth about Judy telling a lie to their mother, that she didn't have money to spend on clothes because she went to a concert.

== Critiques ==
=== Androcentrism ===
A critique of Kohlberg's theory is that it emphasizes justice to the exclusion of other values and so may not adequately address the arguments of those who value other moral aspects of actions. Carol Gilligan, in her book In a Different Voice, has argued that Kohlberg's theory is excessively androcentric. Kohlberg's theory was initially based on empirical research using only male participants; Gilligan argued that it did not adequately describe the concerns of women.

Kohlberg stated that women tend to get stuck at level 3, being primarily concerned with details of how to maintain relationships and promote the welfare of family and friends. Men are likely to move on to the abstract principles and thus have less concern with the particulars of who is involved.

Consistent with this observation, Gilligan's theory of moral development does not value justice above other considerations. She developed an alternative theory of moral reasoning based on the ethics of caring. Critics such as Christina Hoff Sommers of the American Enterprise Institute argued that Gilligan's research is ill-founded and that no evidence exists to support her conclusion.

=== Cross-cultural generalizability ===
Kohlberg's stages are not culturally neutral, as demonstrated by its use for several cultures (particularly in the case of the highest developmental stages). Although they progress through the stages in the same order, individuals in different cultures seem to do so at different rates. Kohlberg has responded by saying that although cultures inculcate different beliefs, his stages correspond to underlying modes of reasoning, rather than to beliefs.

Most cultures do place some value of life, truth, and law, but to assert that these values are virtually universal requires more research. While there had been some research done to support Kohlberg's assumption of universality for his stages of moral development, there are still plenty of caveats and variations yet to be understood and researched. Regarding universality, stages 1, 2, and 3 of Kohlberg's theory can be seen as universal stages cross culturally, only until stages 4 and 5 does universality begin to be scrutinized.

According to Snarey and Kelio, Kohlberg's theory of moral development is not represented in ideas like Gemeinschaft of the communitive feeling. While there had been criticism directed towards the cross-cultural universality of Kohlberg's theory, Carolyn Edwards argued that the dilemma interview method, the standard scoring system, and the cognitive-development theory are all valid and productive in teaching and understanding of moral reasoning across all cultures.

=== Inconsistency in moral judgments ===
Another criticism of Kohlberg's theory is that people frequently demonstrate significant inconsistency in their moral judgements. This often occurs in moral dilemmas involving drinking and driving and business situations where participants have been shown to reason at a subpar stage, typically using more self-interested reasoning (stage two) than authority and social order obedience reasoning (stage four). Kohlberg's theory is generally considered to be incompatible with inconsistencies in moral reasoning.

Jeremy Carpendale has argued that Kohlberg's theory should be modified to focus on the view that the process of moral reasoning involves integrating varying perspectives of a moral dilemma rather than simply fixating on applying rules. This view would allow for inconsistency in moral reasoning since individuals may be hampered by their inability to consider different perspectives.

Krebs and Denton have also attempted to modify Kohlberg's theory to account for conflicting findings but eventually concluded that the theory cannot account for how most individuals make moral decisions in their everyday lives. Immanuel Kant "predicted" and rebutted that argument when he considered such actions as opening an exception for ourselves in the categorical imperative.

=== Reasoning vs. intuition ===
Other psychologists have questioned the assumption that moral action is primarily a result of formal reasoning. Social intuitionists such as Jonathan Haidt argue that individuals often make moral judgments without weighing concerns such as fairness, law, human rights or ethical values. Thus the arguments analyzed by Kohlberg and other rationalist psychologists could be considered post hoc rationalizations of intuitive decisions; moral reasoning may be less relevant to moral action than Kohlberg's theory suggests.

=== Apparent lack of postconventional reasoning in moral exemplars ===
In 1999, some of Kohlberg's measures were tested when Anne Colby and William Damon published a study in which the development was examined in the lives of moral exemplars that exhibited high levels of moral commitment in their everyday behavior. The researchers utilized the moral judgement interview (MJI) and two standard dilemmas to compare the 23 exemplars with a more ordinary group of people. The intention was to learn more about moral exemplars and to examine the strengths and weaknesses of the Kohlberg measure. They found that the MJI scores were not clustered at the high end of Kohlberg's scale; they ranged from stage 3 to stage 5. Half landed at the conventional level (stages 3, 3/4, and 4) and the other half landed at the postconventional level (stages 4/5 and 5).

Compared to the general population, the scores of the moral exemplars may be somewhat higher than those of groups not selected for outstanding moral behaviour. Researchers noted that the "moral judgement scores are clearly related to subjects' educational attainment in this study". Among the participants that had attained college education or above, there was no difference in moral judgement scores between genders. The study noted that although the exemplars' scores may have been higher than those of nonexemplars, it is also clear that one is not required to score at Kohlberg's highest stages in order to exhibit high degrees of moral commitment and exemplary behaviour.

Apart from their scores, it was found that the 23 participating moral exemplars described three similar themes within all of their moral developments: certainty, positivity, and the unity of self and moral goals. The unity between self and moral goals was highlighted as the most important theme as it is what truly sets the exemplars apart from the 'ordinary' people. It was discovered that the moral exemplars see their morality as a part of their sense of identity and sense of self, not as a conscious choice or chore. Also, the moral exemplars showed a much broader range of moral concern than did the ordinary people and go beyond the normal acts of daily moral engagements.

Rather than confirm the existence of a single highest stage, Larry Walker's cluster analysis of a wide variety of interview and survey variables for moral exemplars found three types: the "caring" or "communal" cluster was strongly relational and generative, the "deliberative" cluster had sophisticated epistemic and moral reasoning, and the "brave" or "ordinary" cluster was less distinguished by personality.

== Continued relevance ==
Kohlberg's bodies of work on the stages of moral development have been utilized by others working in the field. One example is the Defining Issues Test (DIT) created in 1979 by James Rest, originally as a pencil-and-paper alternative to the Moral Judgement Interview. Heavily influenced by the six-stage model, it made efforts to improve the validity criteria by using a quantitative test, the Likert scale, to rate moral dilemmas similar to Kohlberg's. It also used a large body of Kohlbergian theory such as the idea of "post-conventional thinking".

In 1999 the DIT was revised as the DIT-2. The test continues to be used in many areas where moral testing is required, such as divinity, politics, and medicine.

=== William Damon's contribution to Kohlberg's moral theory ===
The American psychologist William Damon developed a theory that is based on Kohlberg's research. Still, it has the merit of focusing on and analysing moral reasoning's behavioural aspects and not just the idea of justice and rightness. Damon's methodology was experimental, using children aged between 3 and 9 who were required to share toys. The study applied the sharing resources technique to operationalise the dependent variable it measured: equity or justice.

The results demonstrated an obvious stage presentation of the righteous, just behaviour.

According to William Damon's findings, justice, transposed into action, has 6 successive levels:

- Level 1 – nothing stops the egocentric tendency. The children want all the toys without feeling the need to justify their preference. The justice criterion is the absolute wish of the self;
- Level 2 – the child wants almost all of the toys and justifies his choice in an arbitrary or egocentric manner (e.g., "I should play with them because I have a red dress", "They are mine because I like them!");
- Level 3 – the equality criterion emerges (e.g., "We should all have the same number of toys");
- Level 4 – the merit criterion emerges (e.g., "Johnny should take more because he was such a good boy");
- Level 5 – necessity is seen as the most important selection criterion (e.g., "She should take the most because she was sick", "Give more to Matt because he is poor");
- Level 6 – the dilemmas begin to come up: can justice be achieved, considering only one criterion? The consequence is the combining of criteria: equality + merit, equality + necessity, necessity + merit, equality + necessity + merit.

The final level of Damon's mini theory is an interesting display, in the social setting, of the logical cognitive operationalisation. This permits decentration and the combination of many points of view, favouring allocentrism.

== See also ==
- Elliot Turiel
- James W. Fowler – Stages of faith development
- Jane Loevinger – Stages of ego development
- Michael Commons – Model of hierarchical complexity
- Moral hierarchy
- Positive disintegration
- Social cognitive theory of morality
- Universal value
