= Mark Thompson (Minnesota politician) =

American politician

Member of the Minnesota House of Representatives
- In office 2001–2002

Mark Thompson (born February 4, 1960) was an American educator and politician.

Born in Hennepin County, Minnesota, Thompson served in the United States Army. He graduated from University of Minnesota and taught government in middle school. Thompson served on the New Hope, Minnesota city council in 1999 and 2000 and then served as a Democratic member of the Minnesota House of Representatives in 2001 and 2002.
