= Defining Issues Test =

Component model of moral development

The Defining Issues Test is a component model of moral development devised by James Rest in 1974. The University of Minnesota formally established the Center for the Study of Ethical Development as a vehicle for research around this test in 1982. The Center relocated to larger premises within the University of Alabama and is now located in Capital Hall. Because it is not possible to score DIT-1 and DIT-2 personally, the Center of Ethical Development at the University of Alabama offers scoring to scholars and researchers worldwide.

The Defining Issues Test is a proprietary self-report measure which uses a Likert-type scale to give quantitative ratings and rankings to issues surrounding five different moral dilemmas, or stories. Specifically, respondents rate 12 issues in terms of their importance to the corresponding dilemma and then rank the four most important issues. The issue statements that respondents respond to are not fully developed stances which fall on one side or another of the presented dilemma. Rather, they are conceptualized as fragments of reasoning, to which respondents must project meaning. Meaning is projected by means of moral reasoning schemas (each of which is explained below). A schema is a mental representation of stimuli that has previously been encountered, which allows one to make sense of newly experienced, but related, stimuli. So, when a respondent reads an issue statement that both makes sense to them, as well as triggers a preferred schema, that statement is given a high rating and ranking. Conversely, when a respondent reads an issue statement that is either construed as nonsensical or overly simplistic, the item receives a low rating. Patterns of ratings and rankings reveal information about three specific schemas of moral reasoning: the Personal Interests Schema, the Maintaining Norms Schema and the Postconventional Schema.

== Components ==
The personal interests schema is regarded as the least developmentally advanced level of moral reasoning. In operating primarily at the Personal Interests level, the respondent takes into consideration what the protagonist of the story, or those close to the protagonist, has to gain or lose. The Maintaining Norms Schema is considered more advanced than the Personal Interests Schema, as it emphasizes more than the individual.

At the maintaining norms reasoning level, law and authority are important, as each of these helps to uphold social order, which is paramount to this schema. So, a respondent who is predominantly using this schema will take into consideration what needs to be done in order to be compliant with the social order of society. Finally, the Postconventional Schema is regarded as the most developmentally advanced.

At the post-conventional reasoning level, laws are not simply blindly accepted (as with the maintaining norms schema) but are scrutinized in order to ensure society-wide benefit. So, a respondent who is primarily using this schema will focus on what is best for society as a whole. For example, the civil rights movement was a product of postconventional reasoning, as followers were most concerned with the society-wide effects of inequality.

Though an individual may rely more heavily on one of the aforementioned schemas, moral reasoning is typically informed, to varying degrees, by each of the schemas.

One of the Defining Issues Test's original purposes was to assess the transition of moral development from adolescence to adulthood. In 1999 the test was revised in the DIT-2 for brevity, clarity and more powerful validity criteria.

The Defining Issues Test has been dubbed "Neo-Kohlbergian" by its constituents as it emphasizes cognition, personal construction, development and postconventional moral thinking - reflective of the work by Lawrence Kohlberg and his stages of moral development.

Also, the center provides the Intermediate Concepts Measures (ICM) A new kind of measure has been developed as part of the Intermediate Concept Approach which, unlike DIT, allows bespoke measure development in specific contextual settings. For example, researchers in a law school might want to work with the center to develop a measure incorporating dilemmas relevant to the law profession to assess ethical aspects of a course of study. However, a growing number of measures are also available 'off-the-shelf' for certain populations such as adolescents, dentists, or Army officers for example. Unlike DIT, Intermediate Concept Measures, or ICMs, do not directly assess bedrock moral schemas because so-called intermediate concepts are located at a level between bedrock moral schemas and specific contextual norms (e.g. professional codes) and are specific to daily life and similar to virtue-based concepts such as honesty or courage. ICM Examples US Version of Adolescent ICM UK Version of Adolescent ICM Military ICM
