= New Hope, Minnesota =

City in Minnesota, United States

- City
- City of New Hope
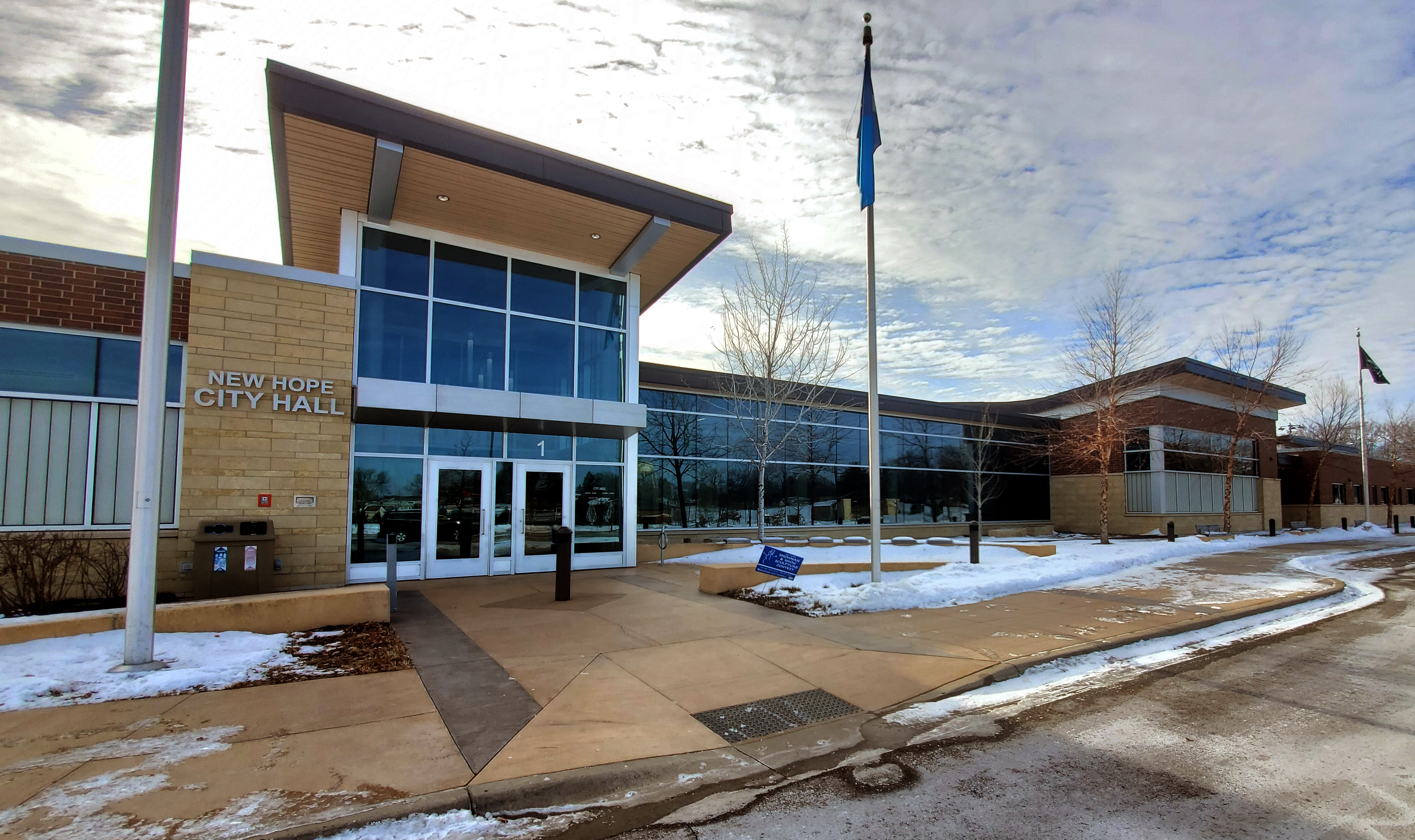
- City Hall

- Logo

- Location of the city of New Hope within Hennepin County, Minnesota
- Coordinates: 45°2′N 93°23′W
- Country: United States
- State: Minnesota
- County: Hennepin
- Founded: 1936

Government
  - Mayor: John Elder

Area
  - Total: 5.12 sq mi (13.25 km^{2})
  - Land: 5.06 sq mi (13.10 km^{2})
  - Water: 0.058 sq mi (0.15 km^{2}) 1.18%
- Elevation: 932 ft (284 m)

Population (2020)
  - Total: 21,986
  - Density: 4,347.7/sq mi (1,678.64/km^{2})
- Time zone: UTC-6 (Central)
  - Summer (DST): UTC-5 (Central)
- ZIP codes: 55427, 55428
- Area code: 763
- FIPS code: 27-45628
- GNIS feature ID: 0648510
- Website: City of New Hope

New Hope is a city in Hennepin County, Minnesota, United States and a northwestern suburb of Minneapolis. The population was 21,986 at the 2020 census.

== History ==
New Hope was originally a farming community called Hope in Crystal Lake Township. In 1936, rural residents of the township broke away and formed their own township, choosing the name New Hope. The area, originally part of the Crystal Lake Township, experienced significant growth and development following World War II, transforming the rural farmland into a suburban community. In 1953, the residents of the western part of Crystal Lake Township sought independence and municipal services, leading to New Hope's incorporation as a village. By 1974, New Hope had achieved city status, reflecting its expanding population and urbanization.

== Geography ==
According to the United States Census Bureau, the city has an area of 5.10 square miles (13.21 km^{2}), of which 5.04 square miles (13.05 km^{2}) is land and 0.06 square miles (0.16 km^{2}) is water. It is 12 miles northwest of downtown Minneapolis.

New Hope shares a border with Brooklyn Park to the north, Crystal to the east, Golden Valley to the south, Plymouth to the west and Maple Grove to the northwest.

=== Climate ===
According to the Köppen Climate Classification system, New Hope has a hot-summer humid continental climate, abbreviated "Dfa" on climate maps. The hottest temperature recorded in New Hope was 102 °F (38.9 °C) on July 3, 1990, while the coldest temperature recorded was −33 °F (−36.1 °C) on February 2, 1996.

Climate data for New Hope, Minnesota, 1991–2020 normals, extremes 1990–present
| Month | Jan | Feb | Mar | Apr | May | Jun | Jul | Aug | Sep | Oct | Nov | Dec | Year |
|---|---|---|---|---|---|---|---|---|---|---|---|---|---|
| Record high °F (°C) | 55 (13) | 62 (17) | 81 (27) | 91 (33) | 98 (37) | 100 (38) | 102 (39) | 99 (37) | 98 (37) | 88 (31) | 76 (24) | 67 (19) | 102 (39) |
| Mean maximum °F (°C) | 43.0 (6.1) | 47.2 (8.4) | 64.4 (18.0) | 79.4 (26.3) | 87.9 (31.1) | 92.2 (33.4) | 93.0 (33.9) | 90.2 (32.3) | 86.8 (30.4) | 78.9 (26.1) | 62.0 (16.7) | 46.0 (7.8) | 95.0 (35.0) |
| Mean daily maximum °F (°C) | 23.6 (−4.7) | 28.8 (−1.8) | 41.9 (5.5) | 56.7 (13.7) | 69.0 (20.6) | 78.2 (25.7) | 82.3 (27.9) | 79.7 (26.5) | 71.8 (22.1) | 57.4 (14.1) | 41.4 (5.2) | 28.5 (−1.9) | 54.9 (12.7) |
| Daily mean °F (°C) | 15.3 (−9.3) | 19.8 (−6.8) | 32.4 (0.2) | 45.9 (7.7) | 58.4 (14.7) | 68.2 (20.1) | 72.7 (22.6) | 70.3 (21.3) | 62.1 (16.7) | 48.2 (9.0) | 33.6 (0.9) | 21.0 (−6.1) | 45.7 (7.6) |
| Mean daily minimum °F (°C) | 7.0 (−13.9) | 10.8 (−11.8) | 22.8 (−5.1) | 35.2 (1.8) | 47.7 (8.7) | 58.1 (14.5) | 63.1 (17.3) | 60.8 (16.0) | 52.4 (11.3) | 39.0 (3.9) | 25.8 (−3.4) | 13.6 (−10.2) | 36.4 (2.4) |
| Mean minimum °F (°C) | −15.8 (−26.6) | −10.2 (−23.4) | 0.3 (−17.6) | 19.2 (−7.1) | 33.8 (1.0) | 45.0 (7.2) | 52.4 (11.3) | 50.4 (10.2) | 36.3 (2.4) | 23.9 (−4.5) | 8.4 (−13.1) | −8.9 (−22.7) | −18.2 (−27.9) |
| Record low °F (°C) | −30 (−34) | −33 (−36) | −18 (−28) | 4 (−16) | 26 (−3) | 38 (3) | 47 (8) | 39 (4) | 30 (−1) | 13 (−11) | −6 (−21) | −22 (−30) | −33 (−36) |
| Average precipitation inches (mm) | 0.95 (24) | 1.02 (26) | 1.88 (48) | 3.31 (84) | 4.49 (114) | 4.64 (118) | 4.51 (115) | 4.18 (106) | 3.45 (88) | 2.98 (76) | 1.87 (47) | 1.40 (36) | 34.68 (882) |
| Average snowfall inches (cm) | 10.1 (26) | 10.1 (26) | 9.0 (23) | 5.1 (13) | 0.0 (0.0) | 0.0 (0.0) | 0.0 (0.0) | 0.0 (0.0) | 0.0 (0.0) | 0.8 (2.0) | 6.9 (18) | 12.3 (31) | 54.3 (139) |
| Average precipitation days (≥ 0.01 in) | 9.9 | 7.5 | 9.0 | 11.4 | 12.9 | 12.1 | 10.6 | 9.2 | 9.5 | 10.0 | 8.1 | 10.4 | 120.6 |
| Average snowy days (≥ 0.1 in) | 9.8 | 7.5 | 5.5 | 2.9 | 0.0 | 0.0 | 0.0 | 0.0 | 0.0 | 0.8 | 4.7 | 9.7 | 40.9 |
Source 1: NOAA
Source 2: National Weather Service

== Demographics ==
Historical population
| Census | Pop. | Note | %± |
|---|---|---|---|
| 1940 | 394 | | — |
| 1950 | 691 | | 75.4% |
| 1960 | 3,552 | | 414.0% |
| 1970 | 23,180 | | 552.6% |
| 1980 | 23,087 | | −0.4% |
| 1990 | 21,853 | | −5.3% |
| 2000 | 20,873 | | −4.5% |
| 2010 | 20,339 | | −2.6% |
| 2020 | 21,986 | | 8.1% |
U.S. Decennial Census; 2018 Estimate

=== Racial and ethnic composition ===
New Hope city, Minnesota – Racial and ethnic composition Note: the US Census treats Hispanic/Latino as an ethnic category. This table excludes Latinos from the racial categories and assigns them to a separate category. Hispanics/Latinos may be of any race.
| Race / Ethnicity (NH = Non-Hispanic) | Pop 2000 | Pop 2010 | Pop 2020 | % 2000 | % 2010 | % 2020 |
|---|---|---|---|---|---|---|
| White alone (NH) | 17,748 | 14,522 | 13,177 | 85.03% | 71.40% | 59.93% |
| Black or African American alone (NH) | 1,188 | 2,965 | 4,818 | 5.69% | 14.58% | 21.91% |
| Native American or Alaska Native alone (NH) | 96 | 80 | 110 | 0.46% | 0.39% | 0.50% |
| Asian alone (NH) | 666 | 772 | 949 | 3.19% | 3.80% | 4.32% |
| Native Hawaiian or Pacific Islander alone (NH) | 8 | 4 | 8 | 0.04% | 0.02% | 0.04% |
| Other race alone (NH) | 41 | 24 | 125 | 0.20% | 0.12% | 0.57% |
| Mixed race or Multiracial (NH) | 405 | 642 | 1,130 | 1.94% | 3.16% | 5.14% |
| Hispanic or Latino (any race) | 721 | 1,330 | 1,669 | 3.45% | 6.54% | 7.59% |
| Total | 20,873 | 20,339 | 21,986 | 100.00% | 100.00% | 100.00% |

=== 2020 census ===
As of the 2020 census, New Hope had a population of 21,986. The median age was 38.5 years. 21.5% of residents were under the age of 18 and 18.1% of residents were 65 years of age or older. For every 100 females there were 94.2 males, and for every 100 females age 18 and over there were 92.4 males age 18 and over.

100.0% of residents lived in urban areas, while 0.0% lived in rural areas.

There were 8,984 households in New Hope, of which 27.6% had children under the age of 18 living in them. Of all households, 39.8% were married-couple households, 21.1% were households with a male householder and no spouse or partner present, and 31.4% were households with a female householder and no spouse or partner present. About 33.4% of all households were made up of individuals and 13.3% had someone living alone who was 65 years of age or older.

There were 9,364 housing units, of which 4.1% were vacant. The homeowner vacancy rate was 0.8% and the rental vacancy rate was 5.3%.

Racial composition as of the 2020 census
| Race | Number | Percent |
|---|---|---|
| White | 13,449 | 61.2% |
| Black or African American | 4,861 | 22.1% |
| American Indian and Alaska Native | 136 | 0.6% |
| Asian | 954 | 4.3% |
| Native Hawaiian and Other Pacific Islander | 8 | 0.0% |
| Some other race | 940 | 4.3% |
| Two or more races | 1,638 | 7.5% |
| Hispanic or Latino (of any race) | 1,669 | 7.6% |

=== 2010 census ===
As of the census of 2010, there were 20,339 people, 8,427 households, and 5,032 families living in the city. The population density was 4,035.5 inhabitants per square mile (1,558.1/km^{2}). There were 9,051 housing units at an average density of 1,795.8 per square mile (693.4/km^{2}). The racial makeup of the city was 74.5% White, 14.7% African American, 0.4% Native American, 3.8% Asian, 2.9% from other races, and 3.6% from two or more races. Hispanic or Latino of any race were 6.5% of the population.

There were 8,427 households, of which 28.4% had children under age 18 living with them, 43.1% were married couples living together, 12.6% had a female householder with no husband present, 4.0% had a male householder with no wife present, and 40.3% were non-families. 33.3% of all households were made up of individuals, and 13.1% had someone living alone who was 65 or older. The average household size was 2.31 and the average family size was 2.97.

The median age in the city was 39.4. 22% of residents were under 18; 7.3% were between 18 and 24; 27.8% were from 25 to 44; 24.4% were from 45 to 64; and 18.6% were 65 or older. The gender makeup of the city was 46.9% male and 53.1% female.

=== 2000 census ===
As of the census of 2000, there were 20,873 people, 8,665 households, and 5,268 families living in the city. The population density was 4,098.6 inhabitants per square mile (1,582.5/km^{2}). There were 8,746 housing units at an average density of 1,717.4 per square mile (663.1/km^{2}). The racial makeup of the city was 86.66% White, 5.78% African American, 0.46% Native American, 3.21% Asian, 0.04% Pacific Islander, 1.74% from other races, and 2.11% from two or more races. Hispanic or Latino of any race were 3.45% of the population.

There were 8,665 households, of which 27.2% had children under 18 living with them, 47.2% were married couples living together, 10.4% had a female householder with no husband present, and 39.2% were non-families. 32.3% of all households were made up of individuals, and 12.5% had someone living alone who was 65 or older. The average household size was 2.29 and the average family size was 2.91.

In the city, the population was spread out, with 21.3% under 18, 8.1% from 18 to 24, 30.2% from 25 to 44, 22.7% from 45 to 64, and 17.8% who were 65 or older. The median age was 38. For every 100 females, there were 86.6 males. For every 100 females 18 and over, there were 83.4 males.

The median income for a household was $46,795, and the median income for a family was $60,424. Males had a median income of $41,192 versus $29,454 for females. The per capita income was $23,562. About 4.1% of families and 6.5% of the population were below the poverty line, including 7.8% of those under 18 and 6.3% of those 65 or older.

== Politics ==
Presidential election results 1960–2020

Precinct General Election Results
| Year | Republican | Democratic | Third parties |
|---|---|---|---|
| 2020 | 30.1% 3,579 | 67.3% 8,006 | 2.6% 307 |
| 2016 | 31.8% 3,500 | 59.4% 6,542 | 8.8% 972 |
| 2012 | 37.9% 4,344 | 59.9% 6,873 | 2.2% 248 |
| 2008 | 39.6% 4,542 | 58.7% 6,740 | 1.7% 203 |
| 2004 | 42.8% 4,865 | 56.3% 6,397 | 0.9% 102 |
| 2000 | 40.3% 4,371 | 53.3% 5,777 | 6.4% 695 |
| 1996 | 33.6% 3,410 | 56.7% 5,757 | 9.7% 993 |
| 1992 | 33.2% 3,823 | 44.8% 5,165 | 22.0% 2,539 |
| 1988 | 47.0% 5,463 | 53.0% 6,163 | 0.0% 0 |
| 1984 | 52.3% 6,288 | 47.7% 5,730 | 0.0% 0 |
| 1980 | 41.6% 4,716 | 47.4% 5,371 | 11.0% 1,239 |
| 1976 | 46.9% 5,062 | 51.4% 5,547 | 1.7% 182 |
| 1972 | 57.9% 5,705 | 40.6% 3,999 | 1.5% 154 |
| 1968 | 41.5% 2,926 | 55.4% 3,908 | 3.1% 224 |
| 1964 | 36.7% 1,378 | 63.1% 2,371 | 0.2% 9 |
| 1960 | 44.8% 632 | 55.0% 776 | 0.2% 2 |

== Education ==
New Hope is in the Robbinsdale Public School District. Schools in New Hope include Robbinsdale Cooper High School, Meadow Lake Elementary, Robbinsdale Spanish Immersion, Sonnesyn Elementary, and Holy Trinity Lutheran School, a Christian Pre-K-8 grade school of the Wisconsin Evangelical Lutheran Synod (WELS).

== Notable people ==
- Leo G. Adams - Minnesota state legislator
- Curt Hennig - professional wrestler, entombed at Gethsemane Cemetery.
- Dorothy Hokr - Minnesota state legislator.
- Tim Vakoc – first United States military chaplain to be critically injured during Operation Iraqi Freedom, died in New Hope.
- Rashad Vaughn - NBA player for Milwaukee Bucks
- Mark Thompson - Minnesota state legislator
- Mariana Cress - athlete in the 2016 Rio Olympics
- Lance Pitlick - NHL player for Ottawa Senators and Florida Panthers
- Steve Zahn - American actor and comedian
