= Dorothy Hokr =

American homemaker and politician

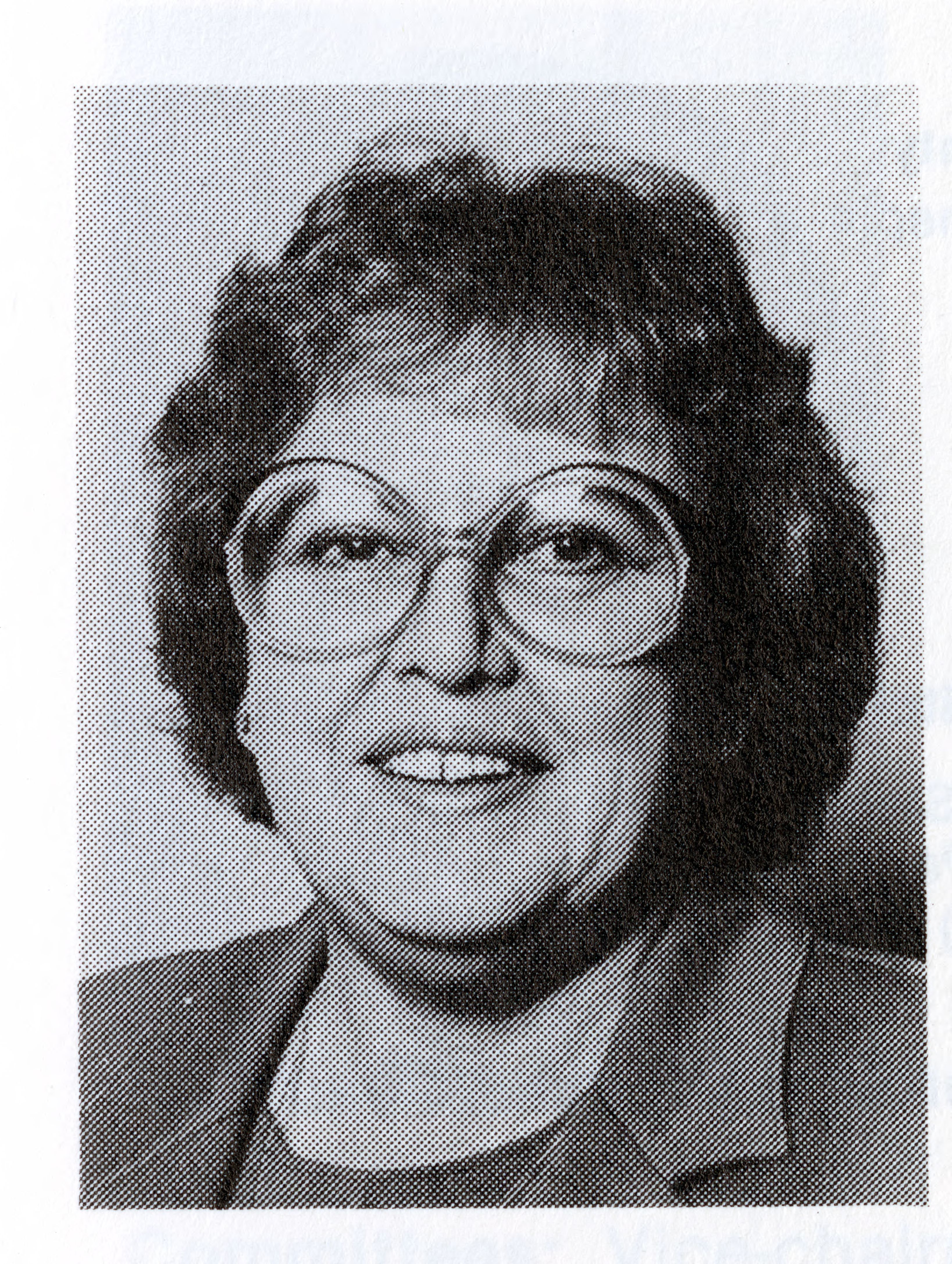

Member of the Minnesota House of Representatives.

Dorothy I. Hokr (June 22, 1923 – March 26, 1998) was an American homemaker and politician.

Born in The Bronx, New York City, New York, Hokr grew up in Miami, Florida. In 1964, Hokr, her husband Leroy "Lee", and the family moved to Minnesota. Hokr was a homemaker and in the real estate business. She served on the New Hope, Minnesota, city council from 1976 to 1981. From 1981 to 1985, Hokr served in the Minnesota House of Representatives and was a Republican. In 1988, Hokr and her husband moved to The Villages in Lady Lake, Florida. Hokr served as president of The Villages Property Owners Association. Hokr died of cancer in Lady Lake, Florida.
