= Lawrence Kohlberg =

American psychologist (1927–1987)

- Born: October 25, 1927; Bronxville, New York, US
- Died: January 17, 1987 (aged 59); Winthrop, Massachusetts, US
- Education: University of Chicago (BA, PhD)
- Known for: Lawrence Kohlberg's stages of moral development
- Scientific career
- Fields: Psychology
- Workplaces: University of Chicago; Harvard University

Lawrence Kohlberg (/ˈkoʊlbɜːrɡ/; October 25, 1927 – January 17, 1987) was an American psychologist best known for his theory of stages of moral development.

He served as a professor in the Psychology Department at the University of Chicago and at the Graduate School of Education at Harvard University. Even though it was considered unusual in his era, he decided to study the topic of moral judgment, extending Jean Piaget's account of children's moral development from 25 years earlier. He proposed that moral reasoning develops through six identifiable stages, grouped into three levels: pre-conventional, conventional, and post-conventional, described in his framework of stages of moral development. His research showed that these stages appear in a fixed developmental sequence and reflect the increasing complexity of how people justify moral choices. In fact, it took Kohlberg five years before he was able to publish an article based on his views. Kohlberg's work reflected and extended not only Piaget's findings but also the theories of philosophers George Herbert Mead and James Mark Baldwin. At the same time he was creating a new field within psychology: "moral development".

In an empirical study using six criteria, such as citations and recognition, Kohlberg was found to be the 30th most eminent psychologist of the 20th century.

== Early life and education ==
Lawrence Kohlberg was born in Bronxville, New York in 1927. He was the youngest of four children born to Jewish-German entrepreneur Alfred Kohlberg and his second wife, Charlotte Albrecht, a Christian German chemist. His parents separated when he was four years old, and finally divorced when he was 14. From 1933 to 1938, Lawrence and his three siblings rotated between their mother and father for six months at a time. This rotating custody of the Kohlberg children ended in 1938, when the children were allowed to choose the parent with whom they wanted to live.

Kohlberg attended high school at Phillips Academy in Andover, Massachusetts. At age 18, at the end of World War II, he joined the U.S. Merchant Marine. He worked for a time with the Zionist Haganah on a ship smuggling Jewish refugees from Romania into Mandatory Palestine, evading the British blockade. Captured by the British and held at an internment camp on Cyprus, Kohlberg escaped with fellow crew members. He was in Palestine during the fighting in 1948 to establish the state of Israel, but refused to participate in the fighting and focused instead on nonviolent forms of activism. He also lived on a kibbutz during this time, until he was able to return to America in 1948.

After returning to the United States, Kohlberg enrolled at the University of Chicago. At the time it was possible to gain credit for courses by examination, and Kohlberg earned his bachelor's degree in one year, 1948. He then began study for his doctoral degree in psychology, which he completed at Chicago in 1958.

In those early years, Kohlberg read Jean Piaget's work. Kohlberg found a scholarly approach that gave a central place to the individual's reasoning in moral decision making. At the time this contrasted with the current psychological approaches of behaviorism and psychoanalysis that explained morality as simple internalization of external cultural or parental rules, through teaching using reinforcement and punishment or identification with a parental authority.

== Career ==
Kohlberg's first academic appointment was at Yale University, as an assistant professor of psychology, 1958–1961.

Kohlberg spent a year at the Center for Advanced Study in the Behavioral Sciences, in Palo Alto, California, 1961–1962, and then joined the Psychology Department of the University of Chicago as assistant, then associate professor of psychology and human development, 1962–1967. There he instituted the Child Psychology Training Program.

He held a visiting appointment at the Harvard Graduate School of Education, 1967–1968, and then was appointed Professor of Education and Social Psychology there, beginning 1968, where he remained until his death.

In 1969 he accepted Rebecca Shribman-Katz's invitation of the Society for Justice-Ethics-Morals (JEM) and visited Israel to study the morality of young people in that country. This was the beginning of the life-long cooperation between JEM and Kohlberg. JEM published many books in Hebrew under his supervision, merging Kohlberg's morality theory and Jewish morality and putting it into practice, in teaching justice, ethics and morals to judges, lawyers, teachers, police officers, prisoners and the young generation of Israel

In 1978, Kohlberg invited Katz to participate in the conference of Law in a Free Society, which led to the research published in 1980 "Moral Education and Law-Related Education".

== Research methodology ==
Kohlberg's research approach centered on a semi-structured procedure known as the Moral Judgment Interview (MJI), which presented participants with a series of hypothetical moral dilemmas, such as the Heinz dilemma, the stealing medicine dilemma, and later, the doctor's dilemma. During these interviews, participants were not evaluated on the moral choice they made but on the reasoning structures they used to justify those choices. Kohlberg argued that moral development is revealed in the organization of thought, not in agreement with any particular answer.

His methodology was strongly influenced by the clinical interview technique of Piaget, in which interviewers challenge a participant's reasoning to reveal underlying cognitive structures. Using a methodical methodology, Kohlberg created comprehensive scoring guidelines that divided answers into six levels of moral reasoning according to the justification's complexity, abstraction, and perspective-taking. Trained coders were needed for the scoring process, which prioritised structural consistency over isolated statements in each respondent's responses.

A distinctive feature of Kohlberg's methodology was his use of longitudinal research designs. He followed the same participants, 72 boys from Chicago, over more than a decade, re-interviewing them at regular intervals to examine how their moral reasoning evolved with age. This approach allowed him to document both progression and regression across stages and to argue that moral development followed an invariant sequence.

Kohlberg later expanded his methodology to include cross-cultural research, conducting studies in countries such as Mexico, Turkey, and Taiwan. These studies tested whether his stages were universal and whether reasoning patterns appeared in non-Western populations. He also collaborated with colleagues to refine scoring criteria, producing the Standard Issue Scoring System, which increased reliability and addressed earlier criticisms of subjectivity. Kohlberg's methodological innovations helped establish moral reasoning as a measurable psychological construct and set the foundation for later tools such as the Defining Issues Test.

== Stages of moral development ==
In his unpublished 1958 dissertation, Kohlberg described what are now known as Kohlberg's stages of moral development. These stages are planes of moral adequacy conceived to explain the development of moral reasoning. Created while studying psychology at the University of Chicago, the theory was inspired by the work of Jean Piaget and a fascination with children's reactions to moral dilemmas. Kohlberg proposed a form of "Socratic" moral education and reaffirmed John Dewey's idea that development should be the aim of education. He also outlined how educators can influence moral development without indoctrination and how public school can be engaged in moral education consistent with the United States Constitution.

Kohlberg's approach begins with the assumption that humans are intrinsically motivated to explore and become competent at functioning in their environments. In social development, this leads us to imitate role models we perceive as competent and to look to them for validation. Thus our earliest childhood references on the rightness of our and others' actions are adult role models with whom we are in regular contact. Kohlberg also held that there are common patterns of social life, observed in universally occurring social institutions, such as families, peer groups, structures, and procedures for clan or society decision-making, and cooperative work for mutual defense and sustenance. Endeavoring to become competent participants in such institutions, humans in all cultures exhibit similar actions and thoughts concerning the relations of self, others, and the social world. Furthermore, the more one is prompted to have empathy for the other person, the more quickly one learns to function well in cooperative human interactions.

The sequence of stages of moral development thus corresponds to a sequence of progressively more inclusive social circles (family, peers, community, etc.) within which humans seek to operate competently. When those groups function well, oriented by reciprocity and mutual care and respect, growing humans adapt to larger and larger circles of justice, care, and respect. Each stage of moral cognitive development is the realization in conscious thought of the relations of justice, care, and respect exhibited in a wider circle of social relations, including narrower circles within the wider.

Kohlberg's theory holds that moral reasoning, which is the basis for ethical behavior, has six identifiable developmental constructive stages – each more adequate at responding to moral dilemmas than the last. Kohlberg suggested that the higher stages of moral development provide the person with greater capacities/abilities in terms of decision making and so these stages allow people to handle more complex dilemmas. In studying these, Kohlberg followed the development of moral judgment beyond the ages originally studied earlier by Piaget, who also claimed that logic and morality develop through constructive stages. Expanding considerably upon this groundwork, it was determined that the process of moral development was principally concerned with justice and that its development continued throughout the life span, even spawning dialogue of philosophical implications of such research. His model "is based on the assumption of co-operative social organization on the basis of justice and fairness."

Kohlberg studied moral reasoning by presenting subjects with moral dilemmas. He would then categorize and classify the reasoning used in the responses, into one of six distinct stages, grouped into three levels: preconventional, conventional and postconventional. Each level contains two stages. These stages heavily influenced others and have been utilized by others like James Rest in making the Defining Issues Test in 1979.

=== Moral education ===
Kohlberg is most well known among psychologists for his research in moral psychology, but among educators he is known for his applied work of moral education in schools. The three major contributions Kohlberg made to moral education were the use of Moral Exemplars, Dilemma Discussions, and Just Community Schools.

Kohlberg's first method of moral education was to examine the lives of moral exemplars who practiced principled morals such as Martin Luther King Jr., Socrates, and Abraham Lincoln. He believed that moral exemplars' words and deeds increased the moral reasoning of those who watched and listened to them. Kohlberg never tested to see if examining the lives of moral exemplars did in fact increase moral reasoning. Recent research in moral psychology has brought back the value of witnessing moral exemplars in action or learning about their stories. Witnessing the virtuous acts of moral exemplars may not increase moral reasoning, but it has been shown to elicit an emotion known as moral elevation that can increase an individual's desire to be a better person and even has the potential to increase prosocial and moral behavior. Although Kohlberg's hypothesis that moral exemplars could increase moral reasoning might be unfounded, his understanding that moral exemplars have an important place in moral education has growing support.

Dilemma discussions in schools was another method proposed by Kohlberg to increase moral reasoning. Unlike moral exemplars, Kohlberg tested this method by integrating moral dilemma discussion into the curricula of school classes in humanities and social studies. Results of this and other studies using similar methods found that moral discussion does increase moral reasoning and works best if the individual in question is in discussion with a person who is using reasoning that is just one stage above their own.

The final method Kohlberg used for moral education was known as "just communities". In 1974, Kohlberg worked with schools to set up democracy-based programs, where both students and teachers were given one vote to decide on school policies. The purpose of these programs were to build a sense of community in schools in order to promote democratic values and increase moral reasoning. Kohlberg's idea and development of "just communities" were greatly influenced by his time living on a kibbutz as a young adult in 1948 and when he was doing longitudinal cross-cultural research of moral development at Sasa, another kibbutz.

=== Writing ===
Some of Kohlberg's most important publications were collected in his Essays on Moral Development, Vols. I and II, The Philosophy of Moral Development (1981) and The Psychology of Moral Development (1984), published by Harper & Row. Other works published by Kohlgainz or about Kohlberg's theories and research include Consensus and Controversy, The Meaning and Measurement of Moral Development, Lawrence Kohlberg's Approach to Moral Education and Child Psychology and Childhood Education: A Cognitive Developmental View.

=== Applications ===
Kohlberg's work significantly influenced moral education, particularly classroom approaches that emphasize discussion around moral dilemmas to stimulate cognitive conflict and promote higher-level reasoning. Motivated by the idea that students advance when they encounter reasoning slightly above their own stage, Kohlberg and his colleagues developed instructional programs in which teachers facilitate open-ended debate, encourage justification of viewpoints, and foster perspective-taking. These interventions demonstrated measurable gains in students’ moral reasoning scores and became foundational for later character education models.

His theoretical work also inspired the creation of “just community” schools, experimental educational environments in which students and teachers participate directly in collective rule-making, conflict resolution, and democratic decision-making. By granting students equal voice and responsibility in governance, these communities aimed to operationalise Kohlberg's post-conventional concepts in actual institutional settings. According to research on these initiatives, regular engagement in democratic activities can foster social responsibility, moral growth, and a sense of school community.

Beyond educational settings, Kohlberg's framework has been widely applied in professional ethics, where developmental differences in moral reasoning can influence decision-making in complex or high-stakes contexts. In business ethics, researchers use his stages to analyze employee reasoning in cases of corporate misconduct, whistleblowing, and moral leadership. In medical ethics, studies apply Kohlberg's theory to explain how physicians and nurses reason about patient autonomy, triage, and informed consent. His framework has also influenced legal education, where researchers examine how law students justify interpretations of justice, responsibility, and punishment.

Kohlberg's work further contributed to the development of assessment instruments in moral psychology. The most influential of these is the Defining Issues Test (DIT), created by James Rest, which adapts Kohlberg's stage model into a multiple-choice format that measures the importance individuals assign to different types of moral considerations. The DIT and its revised versions (DIT-2) have become standard tools in social science research and are widely used to assess moral reasoning in adolescents, adults, and professionals across cultures.

His work continues to influence contemporary frameworks, showcasing the lasting impact of his stage theory across multiple fields.

== Critiques ==
Carol Gilligan, a fellow researcher of Kohlberg's in the studies of moral reasoning that led to Kohlberg's developmental stage theory, suggested that to make moral judgments based on optimizing concrete human relations is not necessarily a lower stage of moral judgment than to consider objective principles. Postulating that women may develop an empathy-based ethic with a different, but not lower structure than that Kohlberg had described, Gilligan wrote In a Different Voice, a book that founded a new movement of care-based ethics that initially found strong resonance among feminists and later achieved wider recognition.

Kohlberg's response to Carol Gilligan's criticism was that he agreed with her that there is a care moral orientation that is distinct from a justice moral orientation, but he disagreed with her claim that women scored lower than men on measures of moral developmental stages because they are more inclined to use care orientation rather than a justice orientation. Kohlberg disagreed with Gilligan's position on two grounds. Firstly, many studies measuring moral development of males and females found no difference between men and women, and when differences were found, they were attributable to differences in education, work experiences, and role-taking opportunities, but not gender. Secondly, longitudinal studies of females found the same invariant sequence of moral development as previous studies that were of males only. In other words, Gilligan's criticism of Kohlberg's moral development theory was centered on differences between males and females that did not exist. Kohlberg's detailed responses to numerous critics can be read in his book Essays on Moral Development: Vol.II. The Psychology of Moral Development: The Nature and Validity of Moral Stages.

Another criticism against Kohlberg's theory was that it focused too much on reason at the expense of other factors. One problem with Kohlberg's focus on reason was that little empirical evidence found a relationship between moral reasoning and moral behavior. Kohlberg recognized this lack of a relationship between his moral stages and moral behavior. In an attempt to understand this, he proposed two sub-stages within each stage, to explain individual differences within each stage. He then proposed a model of the relationship between moral judgments and moral action. According to Kohlberg, an individual first interprets the situation using their moral reasoning, which is influenced by their moral stage and sub-stage. After interpretation individuals make a deontic choice and a judgment of responsibility, which are both influenced by the stage and sub-stage of the individual. If the individual does decide on a moral action and their obligation to do it, they still need the non-moral skills to carry out a moral behavior. If this model is true then it would explain why research was having a hard time finding a direct relationship between moral reason and moral behavior.

Another problem with Kohlberg's emphasis on moral reasoning is growing empirical support that individuals are more likely to use intuitive "gut reactions" to make moral decisions than use reason-based thought. The high use of intuition directly challenges the place of reason in moral experience. This expanding of the moral domain from reason has raised questions that perhaps morality research is entering areas of inquiry that are not considered real morality, which was a concern of Kohlberg when he first started his research.

Scholars such as Elliot Turiel and James Rest have responded to Kohlberg's work with their own significant contributions.

== Personal life ==
In 1955, while beginning work on his doctoral dissertation, Kohlberg married Lucille Stigberg. The couple had two sons, David and Steven.

=== Death ===
While doing cross-cultural research in Belize in 1971, Kohlberg contracted a tropical parasitic infection, causing him extreme abdominal pain. The long-term effects of the infection and the medications took their toll, and Kohlberg's health declined as he also engaged in increasingly demanding professional work, including "Just Community" prison and school moral education programs. Kohlberg experienced depression as well.

On January 17, 1987, Kohlberg parked at the end of a dead end street in Winthrop, Massachusetts, across from Boston's Logan Airport. He left his wallet with identification on the front seat of his unlocked car and apparently walked into the icy Boston Harbor. His car and wallet were found within a couple of weeks, and his body was recovered some time later, with the late winter thaw, in a tidal marsh across the harbor near the end of a Logan Airport runway.

After Kohlberg's body was recovered and his death confirmed, former students and colleagues published special issues of scholarly journals to commemorate his contribution to developmental psychology.
