= International Center for Academic Integrity =

Nonprofit Organisation

- Founders: Don McCabe, Rutgers University
- Established: 1992
- Mission: To provide resources and catalyze commitment to academic integrity in educational institutions
- Formerly called: Center for Academic Integrity
- Location: Virtual
- Website: http://www.academicintegrity.org/

The International Center for Academic Integrity (ICAI) is a consortium of colleges, universities, and other institutions devoted to the cultivation integrity in educational spaces and endeavors. ICAI provides a forum to identify, affirm, and promote the values of academic integrity among students, faculty, teachers, researchers, and administrators.

ICAI is a registered 501c3 nonprofit organization in the United States. With over 240 institutional member organizations and nearly 1,500 individual representatives, ICAI and its members have surveyed more than 250,000 undergraduate and graduate students to assess practices and mores related to the current climate of academic integrity, primarily in the United States and Canada, and to a lesser extent, worldwide.

== History ==
In response to an initial survey conducted by Dr. Donald McCabe that uncovered more cheating behaviors than had been previously understood, the first official CAI Annual Conference was held in March 1993 at the University of Maryland. By the time of the conference in October 1995 at Georgetown University, membership had already grown from 24 institutional members to 66 schools.

Duke University established the Kenan Ethics Program in 1997, an initiative that would later become the Kenan Institute for Ethics under the leadership of Dr. Elizabeth Kiss. Prior to the establishment of the institute, CAI Executive Director Sally Cole and Dr. Kiss discussed the possibility of CAI moving to North Carolina and affiliating with the Kenan Ethics Program. In the summer of 1997, CAI moved from Stanford University to Duke University and began a three-year affiliation with the Kenan Ethics Program.

With continued support from the William and Flora Hewlett Foundation, in 1998 CAI launched a project to identify and describe the “fundamental values of academic integrity” and their implications for daily campus life. One year later, CAI released a report on The Fundamental Values of Academic Integrity: Honesty, Trust, Respect, Fairness, Responsibility to more than 4,000 college and university presidents, with endorsements from the William and Flora Hewlett Foundation, the John Templeton Foundation, and twenty-three higher education organizations. In 2013, an updated edition of The Fundamental Values of Academic Integrity was revised and updated with the assistance of its members and edited by Dr. Teddi Fishman. This edition added a sixth value: courage.

By 2004, CAI began promoting consulting services provided by its Advisory Council members and launched a student summer internship program. CAI increased the size and scope of the annual conference to an international level, established an “expert registry” of consultants and presenters, and increased visibility and prominence in print and broadcast media. A thorough business analysis led the Center and the Kenan Institute to re-examine the strengths and weaknesses of their partnership. To that end, a “leadership group” composed of founders and past and current presidents - Don McCabe, Bill Kibler, Mary Olson, Jim Lancaster, Patrick Drinan, Mark Hyatt and Katie Meriano - assessed new opportunities for partnerships that would allow CAI to enhance service to its members and the higher education community.

CAI officially moved to its former home at Clemson University on July 2, 2007, where it was housed within the Robert J. Rutland Institute for Ethics and directed by Dr. Teddi Fishman for the next 10 years. In 2010, in order to reflect an expanding membership and international reach, CAI officially became the International Center for Academic Integrity, collaborating actively with sister organization the Asia Pacific Forum on Educational Integrity (APFEI) and helping to launch the European Network on Academic Integrity (ENAI). The first conference to take place as an international organization was held in Markham, Ontario, Canada in October 2011 in collaboration with the University of Toronto. ICAI celebrated its 20th anniversary in 2012 and has since continued to grow internationally with regional conferences in 2014 in Cape Town, South Africa, in Dubai in 2015, and in Athens, Greece, in 2016.

In 2018, ICAI became an independent organization, leaving Clemson to incorporate as a nonprofit organization.
