= The National Caucus of Environmental Legislators =

Non-profit organization

The National Caucus of Environmental Legislators is a 501(c)(3) non-profit organization based in Washington, D.C. Founded in 1996, it consists of over 1,000 state legislators representing all 50 state governments of the United States and both major political parties. The caucus serves as a resource on environmental issues through legislative research, organized events, and by facilitating collaboration between lawmakers working on similar issues.

NCEL has previously worked on such issues as toxic chemicals, conservation, carbon pricing, clean energy, and climate action.
