= Allocentrism =

Personality attribute centering attention on others

Allocentrism is a collectivistic personality attribute whereby people center their attention and actions on other people rather than themselves. It is a psychological dimension which corresponds to the general cultural dimension of collectivism. In fact, allocentrics "believe, feel, and act very much like collectivists do around the world." Allocentric people tend to be interdependent, define themselves in terms of the group that they are part of, and behave according to that group's cultural norms. They tend to have a sense of duty and share beliefs with other allocentrics among their in-group. Allocentric people appear to see themselves as an extension of their in-group and allow their own goals to be subsumed by the in-group's goals. Additionally, allocentrism has been defined as giving priority to the collective self over the private self, particularly if these two selves happen to come into conflict.

== History ==
Allocentrism is closely related to collectivism; it is the psychological manifestation of collectivism. Scholars have discussed collectivism since at least the 1930s. Collectivism has been used to describe cultural level tendencies and has been described as a "broad cultural syndrome". It was not until much later (1985) that Triandis, Leung, Villareal, and Clack proposed that the term allocentrism be used to describe collectivistic tendencies on the individual level. They proposed this because of the confusion that arises when talking about cultural level collectivism versus individual level collectivism. Allocentrism, therefore, has been used since by some scholars to describe personal collectivism, "the individual level analog of cultural collectivism", as a very broad cultural trait.

== Allocentrism versus idiocentrism ==
Allocentrism is contrasted with idiocentrism, the psychological manifestation of individualism. As stated earlier, allocentrism includes holding values and preferences of placing higher importance on in-group needs and goals over one's own, defining oneself in terms of the in-group, and seeing oneself as an extension of the in-group. Idiocentrism, however, is an orientation whereby individuals hold quite different values and preferences from those with an allocentric orientation. Idiocentric people tend to focus more on their own goals and needs rather than in-group ones. They prefer self-reliance, to make their own decisions without worrying about what others think, and enjoy competition. It seems people can be both allocentric and idiocentric, but how much they are either is dependent on the situation and how the individual defines that situation. Certain situations encourage more allocentric behavior. These are found more in some cultures than others. These situations include when people are rewarded by the social context for being group orientated, when cultural norms encourage conformity which leads to success, when goals are easier achieved through group action, and when there are not many options for acting independently.

== Measuring allocentrism ==
When researchers measure collectivism, they tend to use large scale studies that look at the cultural level. They add up many people's responses within different cultures with the unit of analysis the whole culture; the N of these studies is the number of cultures. This can be confusing when trying to measure collectivism on an individual level, which is why the term allocentrism has been suggested. One way to measure allocentrism is to look at what it is correlated with which includes high affiliation with others, low need to be unique, and high sensitivity to rejection. Allocentrism includes a sense of self that is interdependent which can be measured by statements about the self-starting with "I am" or by using interdependence scales. If individuals answer the "I am" statements with statements about others and common fate with others, they are deemed to be more allocentric. This method was highly recommended for measuring allocentrism.

Another aspect of allocentrism is the priority of in-group goals over personal goals and this can be measured using the Collectivism Scale or scales that look at interdependence versus independence. Triandis et al., 1995 Allocentrism has been measured utilizing The Collectivism Scale in three cultures—Korean, Japanese, and American—and found to have good concurrent and criterion validity and acceptable reliability (Cronbach's Alpha .77-.88). It is a ten item, five point Likert scale that assesses how much an individual acts in his or her own self-interest versus his or her group's interest. The group can be defined in various ways such as one's family, peer group, or work group. Allocentrism is a very broad construct and therefore cannot be measured using only a few items; therefore, it is suggested that it be measured with multi-methods due to the limitations of each method.

== Culture ==
Allocentrism tends to be found more in collectivistic cultures (about 60%) but can also be found in all cultures, and in every culture there is a "full distribution of both types". While individualism and collectivism are used on the broad cultural level, Triandis et al. (1985) suggested the use of idiocentrism and allocentrism respectively for conducting analyses on the individual level (within-culture analyses). All humans have both collectivist and individualist cognitive structures; people in collectivist cultures are exposed more to collectivist cognitive structures and hence tend to be more allocentric than those in individualistic cultures. The amount of allocentrism an individual portrays depends in a large part on their culture; there is a possibility that an individual could be high (or low) on both allocentrism and idiocentrism. Different people in the same culture can have different levels of allocentrism and it is both group and setting specific. Minorities in the US such as Hispanics and Asians tend to be highly allocentric. There are certain personality dimensions that all allocentrics share despite whether they are from an individualistic (American) or collectivistic (Japanese and Korean) culture. These dimensions include high affiliation with others, being sensitive to rejection from others, and less of a need for individual uniqueness.

== Situation ==
For allocentrics, the situation is of paramount importance and they tend to define themselves relative to the context. Priming people to think about commonalities that they have with family and friends gets them to be more allocentric. Allocentrics tend to be more cooperative in a collectivistic situation and less in an individualistic situation. There are, however, also transituational aspects to allocentrism. Even when allocentrics are living in a more individualistic culture, they still will put more emphasis on relationships than idiocentrics through joining groups such as gangs, churches, and collectives.

== Sociability ==
Allocentrics tend to receive higher quality and more social support than idiocentrics; they tend to be more social, interdependent with others, and pay a lot of attention to their in-group and family. This could possibly be because some of the important values of allocentrics are cooperation, honesty, and equality. Allocentrics usually perceive that they have more and better social support than idiocentrics. The amount of social support allocentrics receive seems to be related to their well-being with higher support indicative of higher levels of well-being and lower support with lower well-being. Allocentrics tend to be less lonely, receive more social support (and are more satisfied with it), and are more cooperative than idiocentrics.

Subjective well-being (SWB) is term psychological researchers have used when studying happiness Amount of social support allocentrics in collectivist countries received seemed to be related to their well-being with higher support indicative of higher levels of well-being and lower support with lower well-being. North Americans whose lifestyles are more allocentric tend to have higher subjective well-being than those whose life styles are idiocentric. In addition, allocentrics’ evaluation of their in-group in addition to how they perceive others view their group is positively related to higher subjective well-being. Allocentrism had a greater effect on the SWB of African Americans than on Euro-Americans. Furthermore, idiocentrism was more negatively related to SWB for Euro-Americans than it was for African Americans.

== Big Five ==
Allocentrism is related to the Big Five personality traits. It is negatively correlated to openness to experience and positively correlated with agreeableness and conscientiousness (Triandis, 2001).

== Ethnocentricism ==
Allocentrics tend to be more ethnocentric in terms of showing more negative attitudes towards people who are not in their group and more positive attitudes to those in their own group. People who are in allocentrics’ in-group are considered much closer than out-group members who are put at a much larger social distance. Allocentrics tend to minimize with-in group differences while preferring equal outcomes in social dilemmas.

=== Consumer ethnocentrism ===
Allocentric people tend to be more consumer ethnocentric (the tendency to prefer the products on their own countries when shopping). Huang et al., (2008) looked at consumer ethnocentrism (CET) and allocentrism among a group of Taiwanese participants in relation to Korean products sold in Taiwan versus national products. This study found that allocentrism with parents was positively correlated with higher CET. However, allocentrism with friends was negatively correlated with CET.

== Tourism and travel ==
The term allocentrism has also been used in the travel field to have a different meaning from the way it is used in the psychological research. Here the term allocentric traveler refers to a traveler who is an extroverted venturer. This is contrasted with the term psychocentric traveler who is dependable, less adventurous, and cautious. They tend to be curious, confident, seek out novelty, and prefer to travel by plane and alone. They often visit locations that the average traveler would not consider visiting. There are an estimated 4% of true allocentric travelers among tourists, with the majority of travelers being midcentrics (halfway between psychocentric and allocentric). Female allocentric travelers were found to be more neurotic and less extroverted than psychocentric travelers. American and Japanese college students who reported being more horizontally individualistic tended to prefer more allocentric destinations. A gap was shown between the vacations that individuals ideally would like to go on and the ones they actually go on. It was predicted that about 17% of individuals would go to allocentric destinations, however it was found that only 3% did, quite rare. Indeed, it seems people tend to compromise ideal for practicality, however some people will choose allocentric locations at some point in their lives.

== See also ==
- Allophilia – Positive attitude towards others who are different
- Xenocentrism – Preference for the cultural practices of societies other than one's own
