= Dual representation theory =

Psychological theory

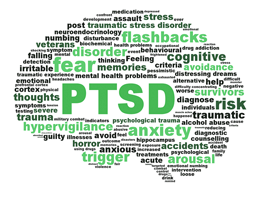
Visual representation of PTSD symptoms and related concepts

Dual representation theory (DRT) is a psychological theory of post-traumatic stress disorder (PTSD) first developed by Chris Brewin, Tim Dalgleish, and Stephen Joseph in 1996. In PTSD a hallmark symptom is the traumatic flashback, in which the person relives specific moments of the traumatic event as though they were happening in the present. This reliving in the present varies from a brief sense of the event occurring again to total absorption in the memory to the exclusion of the current environment (rare). Flashbacks are also not under voluntary control but are triggered by internal or external reminders of the event. They are vivid, emotionally intense, and may involve sensations such as cold and pain that were present during the event. The theory was based on the observation that flashbacks appeared to involve a kind of memory that had not been described by experimental psychologists – the “implicit” memories studied in the laboratory were also involuntary but differed in the person being unaware of them.

DRT proposed the existence of two separate memory systems that run in parallel during memory formation: the verbally accessible memory system (VAM) and situationally accessible memory system (SAM). The VAM system corresponds to ordinary autobiographical memory and contains information that was consciously processed and thus can be voluntarily recalled or described. DRT proposed that the VAM system is impaired during a traumatic event because of the high levels of arousal, creating gaps and discontinuities. What is encoded in the VAM system is the basis for people’s subsequent verbal accounts of the event and their attempts to understand and explain it. In contrast, the SAM system is unaffected by arousal and contains sensory and emotional information that was apprehended too briefly to be consciously encoded. This system is thought to be responsible for the presence of flashbacks and nightmares. A subsequent article proposed that the VAM system is supported by the hippocampus with the SAM system representing a form of non-hippocampally-based memory.

== Background ==
Prior to the development of DRT, existing psychological theories of PTSD fell into two camps: social-cognitive theories and information-processing theories. Social-cognitive theories (e.g. Horowitz's stress-response theory and Janoff-Bulman's shattered assumptions theory) focused on the affected individual's assumptions about the world and the emotional and cognitive impact of the trauma on these assumptions. Information-processing theories (e.g. Foa's emotional processing theory) focused more on attentional biases to threat-related stimuli and how representation and processing of this information may generate intrusive re-experiencing symptoms of PTSD. Brewin and colleagues noted that each of the two theory camps focused on characteristics of PTSD that were distinct and may be explained by different underlying processes. In devising DRT they drew from the work of several previous memory theorists. For example, Johnson and Multhaup had proposed multiple memory representations of everyday experiences. Jacobs and Nadel had argued that the acute effects of stress include a reduction in conscious memory processing and an enhancement to automatic, perceptual processing.

== Major Theory Revisions ==
Based on an independent neural model of spatial memory and imagery the theory was revised in 2010. It incorporated observations of the qualities of the two visual streams which correspond well to descriptions of VAMs and SAMs. Representations based on the ventral visual stream are contextualised within a spatiotemporal and autobiographical setting and are capable of mental manipulation (allocentric). In the R-DRT VAMs are now termed contextualized representations (C-reps). Representations based on the dorsal visual stream are less flexible, based on an egocentric perspective, and incorporate strong sensory, affective, and interoceptive elements. In the R-DRT SAMs are termed sensation-based representations (S-reps). The theory proposes that whereas C-reps and S-reps of an event are normally closely associated, this association can be weakened by the extreme levels of fear or horror produced by a traumatic event. Flashbacks correspond to the retrieval of an S-rep without the context provided by the corresponding C-rep. Therapy serves to overcome the usual avoidance of distressing moments, creating stronger C-reps with stronger connections to the S-reps and returning the memory system to its usual mode of operation.

The Memory and Identity theory of ICD-11 Complex PTSD was published in 2023. In ICD-11 the diagnosis of Complex PTSD requires that, after exposure to an extremely threatening or horrific event or series of events, a person meets the requirements for PTSD (evidence of re-experiencing the traumatic event in the here and now, avoidance, a perception of current threat, and impairment of functioning) as well as three additional severe and persistent features: 1) problems in affect regulation; 2) beliefs about oneself as diminished, defeated or worthless; and 3) difficulties in sustaining relationships and in feeling close to others. The theory attributes the symptoms of Complex PTSD both to disturbances in identity and to the disturbances in memory described by dual representation theory.

== Empirical evidence ==
=== Support ===
People with PTSD can readily distinguish the experience of flashbacks from other parts of the trauma memory. Flashbacks are associated with distinct characteristics and different physiological and neural responses, supporting the argument they involve a different type of memory. As suggested by the theory, people with PTSD appear to have a more general difficulty in forming allocentric spatial memories and, the greater this difficulty, the more severe are their traumatic memory intrusions.

Laboratory studies with healthy participants have also supported key aspects of the theory. In one group of studies participants were shown a trauma film, with a subset of them carrying out a visuospatial interference task such as Tetris. The standard finding is that such a task selectively reduces intrusive memories while leaving voluntary memory intact. This dissociation is more compatible with separate-trace theories such as DRT than with traditional accounts that involve only a single trace of the traumatic event. Also supportive of the theory are findings that other interference tasks that do not actively engage visuospatial processing are much more inconsistent in their effects. Similar to the findings with samples of people with PTSD, individual differences predict how likely participants are to experience intrusions of the trauma film. Those with less good allocentric memory, and who are poorer at encoding contextual information, are more likely to experience subsequent intrusive memories of a traumatic film.

Another group of studies has examined the effects of negative valence on memory for items versus contextual associations. Here, a single-trace theory would predict similar effects on memory for items and associations. A series of experiments showed that enhanced memory for negative items was accompanied by impaired memory for associations between items, including between pairs of negative items. The reduced associative memory but increased item memory for a traumatic item coincides with a shift towards greater amygdalar and less hippocampal activity.

=== Criticism ===
Some studies have found that providing contextual information before exposure to distressing stimuli such as a trauma film actually increases the frequency of intrusive thoughts. This appears to contradict DRT which posits that when contextual information (in the C-reps) and sensory information (in the S-reps) integrate, this results in decreased intrusive symptoms. However, the way a traumatic event is encoded into S-reps and C-reps within the R-DRT does not bear any straightforward relationship to the amount of contextual information present in the input. Rather, it results from an interaction between the information contained in the input and how the input is processed (as determined by factors such as hippocampal efficiency, concurrent distractor tasks, or dissociation). Thus, simply manipulating the presence of additional information does not test the theory in the way that has sometimes been assumed.

The prediction that voluntary recall of the traumatic event would be disorganized and fragmented has been persistently challenged with some authors purportedly finding no differences in the recall of samples with and without PTSD. However, a recent meta-analysis confirmed a strong positive association between disorganization in the trauma narrative and PTSD. The analyses showed that measures that directly address fragmentation or incoherence reliably showed higher scores for samples with PTSD whereas indirect measures (such as those addressing their opposite—coherence) did not show these effects.

== Clinical implications ==
=== Outcomes of trauma exposure ===
According to DRT, the symptoms of PTSD arise when memory processes interact with other pre-trauma, peri-trauma, and post-trauma factors. Some of these factors may include severity and duration of the trauma, existing schemas about the self and the world, social support, and the presence of guilt or shame. Based on these interactions, Brewin and colleagues proposed that there are three possible outcomes of post-traumatic emotional processing: completion/integration, chronic emotional processing, and premature inhibition of processing. Completion/integration occurs when traumatic memories have been consciously processed and integrated with the individual's existing memories and understanding of themselves and the world. This outcome represents recovery from the effects of trauma exposure and minimal post-traumatic symptoms. Chronic emotional processing can occur due to severe or ongoing trauma, lack of social support, or inability to integrate the traumatic experience into existing assumptions about themselves and the world. This can lead to intrusive symptoms and maladaptive preoccupation with the trauma. Premature inhibition of processing occurs when an individual avoids internal (e.g. thoughts, emotions, sensations) and external (e.g. people, places, situations) reminders of the traumatic event. Although this may be successful in minimising distressing intrusive thoughts and memories, the person remains vulnerable to emotional distress when trauma-related stimuli are encountered.

=== Treatment of intrusive memories and PTSD ===
According to more recent versions of dual representation theory trauma moments predominantly encoded as S-reps can be re-encoded to strengthen the corresponding C-reps and the connections between S-reps and C-reps. This can be achieved by picturing the specific moments that have been avoided and holding them in focal attention. Following the principles of retrieval competition, the aim is to create highly accessible contextualised memories (C-reps) that can compete effectively with the original trauma memories. Providing sufficient original cues are encoded in the new memory to guarantee retrieval, there is no requirement for the new representation to correspond exactly to the original situation. Incorporating new and highly memorable elements into what is being pictured may assist later retrievability.

Several analogue studies have tried enhancing memory to prevent trauma films from provoking intrusions. In one experiment, participants performed a recognition memory test for some aspects of the film immediately after presentation. Compared to other aspects that were not tested, the tested segments were less likely to intrude subsequently. Another experiment tested the effects of active contextualisation, in which participants summarised the gist of several films from the perspective of time, place, characters, and happenings. This procedure resulted in fewer intrusions relative to a control group. Allocentric spatial memory training within virtual reality also reduced intrusive memories of a distressing scene.

Deficits in contextual memory for an aversive event can even be observed in mice and appear to be causally involved in PTSD-like memory formation. Treating the deficits by re-exposure to the trauma cues cures the animals’ PTSD-like memory symptoms. In humans an effective therapy for aversive memories is to have people alter their intrusive images by vividly imagining more satisfactory outcomes than really occurred, even involving fantastical elements. This intervention, which creates strong competitor images linked to the original trauma memories, is known as imagery rescripting. More closely based on dual representation theory are interventions that seek to promote allocentric processing by having people imagine their traumatic scenes from different visual perspectives, thereby strengthening contextual processing.
