= Moral identity =

Concept in moral psychology

Moral identity is a concept within moral psychology concerning the importance of morality to a person’s identity, typically construed as either a trait-like individual difference, or set of chronically accessible schemas.

== Blasi's model ==
Empirical studies show that reasoning and emotion only moderately predicted moral action. Scholars, such as Blasi, began proposing identity as a motivating factor in moral motivation. Blasi proposed the self model of moral functioning, which described the effects of the judgment of responsibility to perform a moral action, one's sense of moral identity, and the desire for self-consistency on moral action. Blasi also elaborates on the structure of identity and its connection to morality. According to Blasi, there are two aspects that form identity. One aspect focuses on the specific contents that make up the self (objective identity content), which include moral ideals. The second refers to the ways in which identity is subjectively experienced (subjective identity experience). As the subjective side of identity matures, the objective side tends to lean towards internal contents like values, beliefs, and goals, rather than external identity contents like physical aspects, behaviors, and relationships. A mature subjective identity yearns for a greater sense of self-consistency. Therefore, identity would serve as a motivation for moral action.

Studies of moral exemplars have shown that exemplary moral action often results from the intertwining of personal goals and desires with moral goals, and studies on moral behavior also show a correlation between moral identity and action. Hardy and Carlo raise critical questions about Blasi's model as well, and propose that researchers should seek to better operationalize and measure moral identity and apply findings to moral education and intervention programs.

In Moral Identity and Developmental Theory (2015), Daniel Lapsley comments on Krettenauer and Hertz’s account of moral identity, which describes moral identity as the degree to which being a moral person is central to one's sense of self. Lapsley notes that the connection between morality and selfhood has a long history in philosophy and psychology, referencing thinkers such as Frankfurt, Taylor, and Erikson.

According to Blasi's theory on moral character, moral character is identified by the person's set of the morality of virtues and vices. He theorized willpower, moral desires, and integrity have the capability for a person to act morally by the hierarchical order of virtues. He believed that the "highest" and complex of virtues are expressed by willpower while the "lowest" and simplistic of virtues are expressed integrity. He essentially stated that to have the lower virtues, one must have one or more of the higher virtues. The end goals of moral development identity are to establish and act upon core goals, as well as and use one's strengths to make a difference.

== Other perspectives ==
Anne Colby and William Damon suggest that one's moral identity is formed through that individual's synchronization of their personal and moral goals. This unity of their self and morality is what distinguishes them from non-exemplars and in turn makes them exceptional. Colby and Damon studied moral identity through the narratives of civil rights activist Virginia Foster Durr and Suzie Valadez, who provided services for the poor, whose behavior, actions, and life's works were considered to be morally exemplary by their communities and those with whom they came in contact. Some common characteristics that these moral exemplars possess are certainty, positivity (e.g. enjoyment of work, and optimism), and unity of self and moral goals.

The research suggests that a "transformation of goals" takes place during the evolution of one's moral identity and development and therefore is not an exercise of self-sacrifice but rather one done with great joy; moral exemplars see their personal goals and moral goals as synonymous. This transformation is not always a deliberate process and is most often a gradual process, but can also be rapidly set off by a triggering event. Triggering events can be anything from a powerful moment in a movie to a traumatic life event, or as in the case of Suzie Valadez, the perception of a vision from God. In many of the moral exemplars interviewed, the triggering events and goal transformation did not take place until their 40s. Moral exemplars are said to have the same concerns and commitments as other moral people but to a greater degree, "extensions in scope, intensity and breadth". Furthermore, exemplars possess the ability to be open to new ideas and experiences, also known as an "active receptiveness" to things exterior to themselves.

Daniel Hart conducted a study using African-American and Latin-American Adolescents (Care Exemplars) to see how adolescents who engaged in exemplary levels of prosocial behavior viewed themselves in various aspects. To empirically study self-concept, he used four different conceptual models to illustrate the concept of self in relation to prosocial behavior: Self-Concept as Content, Self-Concept as Semantic Space, Self-Concept as Hierarchy of Selves, and Self-Concept as Theory. The findings suggested that adolescent care exemplars formulated their self-concept differently from comparable peers in several notable ways. In the open-ended self-description sections, care exemplars were more likely to make references to moral traits and moral goals compared with the comparison group. However, these references were still relatively small. In the hierarchy of selves model, care exemplars were shown to incorporate their "ideal self" into their "actual self". Among the exemplar group there was more incorporation of parental representations with the "actual self", rather than peer relationships. Therefore, there was more incorporation of representations of their best friend or the self-expected by the best friend among the comparison adolescents. This lack of peer representation may be due to the alienation that can occur between a care exemplar and their friend, despite the altruism that develops due to prosocial behavior. In a Self-Concept as Theory model, exemplars were most commonly at level 4, a level of self-theory uncommonly reached by adolescents, but more common among exemplars. Additionally, they were also more likely to emphasize academic goals and moral typical activities compared with their comparison adolescents. In a semantic space analysis relating to self-concept, care exemplars were more likely to view their past, present, and future selves in a more continuous manner. On the same topic, comparison adolescents indicated more distinction between the past representations and future ones, indicating lower stability of self. However, there were no significant differences between the exemplars and the control group concerning moral knowledge, indicating no developmental or genetic sophistication between groups. On a whole, both groups showed little to no difference on the property of moral judgements, despite the differences in self-concepts and prosocial actions.

David Wong proposes that we think of cultures in an analogy to a conversation, there are people with different beliefs, values, and norms that can voice their opinion loudly or quietly, but over the course of time these factors can change. A moral culture can provide other members with a kind of "language" where there is plenty of room for different "dialects", this allows moral identities to be established and voiced more. Opposing ideas can create conflict between those who are close to us, such as family and friends, and strangers. This can bring a greater risk of trying to decide the best course of action in which either party will be affected by it. In essence the notion of Wong's theory is that in order to define our true morality it ultimately comes down to acceptance and being able to accommodate within and between cultures around the world. He also believes that the concept of culture as conversation will help reduce the problems with boundaries between cultures, reconcile the autonomy with the cultural aspect of moral identity and call into question the understanding of healthy and well developed moral identity.

A "moral self" is fostered by mutually responsive parenting in childhood. Children with responsive parents develop more empathy, prosociality, a moral self and conscience. Darcia Narvaez describes the neurobiological and social elements of early experience and their effects on moral capacities.

The moral self results when people integrate moral values into their self-concept. Research on the moral self has mostly focused on adolescence as a critical time period for the integration of self and morality (i.e. self and morality are traditionally seen as separate constructs that become integrated in adolescence. However, the moral self may be established around age 2–3 years. In fact, children as young as 5 years-old are able to consistently identify themselves as having certain moral behavioral preferences. Children's moral self is also increasingly predictive of moral emotions with age.

== Association with moral behavior ==
A 2016 meta-analysis, summarizing 111 studies, reported that moral identity is positively (albeit only modestly) associated with moral behavior, concluding that "moral identity fares no better as a predictor of moral action than other psychological constructs."

== See also ==
- Moral development
- Moral disengagement
- Moral reasoning
