= Carolyn Zahn-Waxler =

Developmental psychologist

- Occupations: Honorary Fellow, Center for Healthy Minds, University of Wisconsin–Madison

Academic background
- Education: University of Minnesota University of Wisconsin

Carolyn Zahn-Waxler is an American developmental psychologist known for studying morality over the life span, social emotions, and empathy in childhood. She holds the position of Honorary Fellow at the Center for Healthy Minds at the University of Wisconsin–Madison.

Zahn-Waxler won the Distinguished Scientific Contributions to Child Development Award from Society for Research in Child Development in 2021. In 2015, she was awarded the G. Stanley Hall Award for Distinguished Contribution to Developmental Psychology from Division 7 of the American Psychological Association (APA). Zahn-Waxler and her colleagues received the APA George A. Miller Award for an Outstanding Recent Article in General Psychology for their article "The developmental origins of a disposition toward empathy: Genetic and environmental contributions" in 2011.

Zahn-Waxler was President of APA Division 7, Developmental Psychology from 1997 to 1998. She served as Associate Editor, then Editor-in-chief of the journal Developmental Psychology in the 1990s. She gave a TEDx talk for TEDxGoldenGate on June 11, 2011.

== Biography ==
Zahn-Waxler is from Sturgeon Bay, Wisconsin. Her father grew up on a farm and was the first one in the family to go to college. She states he was an alcoholic, but this went largely unnoticed due to her mother's mental state. Her mother was severely depressed during her childhood. Her natural curiosity about human nature and her mother's mental illness helped to form her research interests. She has a younger sister.

Zahn-Waxler received her B.A. degree in Psychology at University of Wisconsin in 1962. She attended graduate school at University of Minnesota where she obtained her master's degree in 1964 and her Ph.D in Child Psychology in 1967. She worked under the supervision of Herbert Pick at University of Minnesota. Here, she did research on children's learning and perception.

After obtaining her Ph.D., she became a post-doctoral fellow and eventually became a tenured research scientist at National Institute of Mental Health. She was chief of the section on child behavioral disorders in the Laboratory of Developmental Psychology. During this time, she worked with Marian Radke-Yarrow. She used observational methods along with psychological experiments to study social, emotional, and moral development in infancy and early childhood.

She served on the Lieutenant Governor Task Force on Women and Depression in Wisconsin inspired by her childhood experiences of depression in her mother.

After her retirement, she and her husband moved to Madison, Wisconsin, where she originally worked as an affiliate in the Psychology Department for a few years and now works as an Honorary Fellow at the Center for Investigating Healthy Minds at the University of Wisconsin–Madison.

== Research ==
Zahn-Waxler's work has focused on altruism and prosocial behaviors in young children. She also focused on how sensitive parenting may help to promote these types of behaviors in children as well as how parents teach their child to express emotions. Along with this, her work also deals with gender differences in how psychopathology may be expressed.

Her work was influential in changing how psychologists viewed empathy in childhood. Before Zahn-Waxler's studies on empathy, most developmental psychologists believed that young children were inherently selfish and did not think about anyone but themselves. Zahn-Waxler's work showed that children displayed empathetic and prosocial behaviors earlier in life than originally thought to be possible. She also highlighted the importance of the environment in which the child grows up in influencing these behaviors.

Zahn-Waxler's most cited studies discuss how empathy develops in the first few years of life. Her studies mainly found that children were able to understand distress in others and displayed empathetic, prosocial behaviors as young as one year old and this increases substantially during the second year of life. Her work also focuses on how the relationship between parent and child as well as the general environment in which the child grows up in can either increase or decrease these types of behaviors in children. Her work found that female individuals were more likely to display internalizing symptoms of psychopathology and more empathetic behaviors than male individuals who tend to display more externalizing symptoms of psychopathology and less empathetic behaviors.

== Selected publications ==
- Zahn–Waxler, C., Klimes–Dougan, B., & Slattery, M. J. (2000). Internalizing problems of childhood and adolescence: Prospects, pitfalls, and progress in understanding the development of anxiety and depression. Development and Psychopathology, 12(3), 443–466.
- Zahn-Waxler, C., Radke-Yarrow, M., & King, R. A. (1979). Child rearing and children's prosocial initiations toward victims of distress. Child Development, 50(2), 319–330.
- Zahn-Waxler, C., Radke-Yarrow, M., Wagner, E., & Chapman, M. (1992). Development of concern for others. Developmental Psychology, 28(1), 126–136.
- Zahn-Waxler, C., Robinson, J. L., & Emde, R. N. (1992). The development of empathy in twins. Developmental Psychology, 28(6), 1038–1047.
- Zahn-Waxler, C., Shirtcliff, E. A., & Marceau, K. (2008). Disorders of childhood and adolescence: Gender and psychopathology. Annual Review of Clinical Psychology, 4(1), 275–303.
