= Social cognitive theory of morality =

The social cognitive theory of morality attempts to explain how moral thinking, in interaction with other psychosocial determinants, govern individual moral conduct. Social cognitive theory adopts an interactionist perspective to the development of moral behavior. Personal factors of the individual, such as individual moral thought, emotional reactions to behavior, personal moral conduct, and factors within their environment, all interact with, and affect each other. Social cognitive theory contests, in many ways, with the stage theories of moral reasoning.

Social cognitive theory attempts to understand why an individual uses a "lower level" of moral reasoning when they are, theoretically, at a higher level. It also attempts to explain the way social interactions help to form new, as well as change existing, moral standards.

The influence of modeling and other social factors are explored as functions of growth and development. Psychologist Albert Bandura believes that moral development is best understood by considering a combination of social and cognitive factors, especially those involving self-control.

== Stage theories ==
Theories grounded in the belief that different types of moral thinking appears in a sequence, from one way of thinking to another, invariantly, are considered stage theories. Both Kohlberg and Piaget's theories about the development of moral reasoning argue that development occurs in stages and that less complex reasoning strategies from lower stages are abandoned in favor of the more complex strategies from the next. In essence, a preference for higher levels of moral thinking is the underlying proposition of stage theories, although what makes higher level moral thinking superior to lower level moral thinking is unclear. However, stage theories tend to downplay the effect of social learning on the individual and the influence the environment can have in certain situations of moral reasoning. For example, even for individuals who are at a higher level stage in their moral development some reasoning may take into consideration the rule of law, some may be concerned with social consequences, and some may yet be concerned with personal feelings. As such, it is possible that developmental trends in moral reasoning do exist but the influence of society and the learning that takes place from it is much too varied to produce uniform moral types in the development of all individuals. Bandura also believed that moral beliefs were formed in child hood during development.

== Bandura's view ==
Bandura argues that in developing a moral self, individuals adopt standards of right and wrong that serve as guides and restraints for conduct. In this self-regulatory process, people monitor their conduct and the conditions under which it occurs, judge it in relation to moral standards, and regulate their actions by the consequences they apply to themselves. They do things that provide them satisfaction and sense of self-worth. They often refrain from engaging in ways that violate their moral standards in order to avoid self-condemnation. Therefore, self-sanctions keep conducts inline with internal standards. In Bandura's view, morality is rooted in self-regulation rather than abstract reasoning. He also argues that moral reasoning follows the same developmental continuum as other mental processes; from concrete to abstract.

== Societal and familial contribution ==
The social cognitive theory of morality argues that personal values and standards of conduct of each individual arise from many different sources of influence and are maintained by institutional promotion. It also argues that a broad and dynamic social reality is what governs the adoption of personal values and standards of conduct. It says that learning from the social environment is a continuous process and personal values and standards that are acquired as the individual develops his/her moral thinking can be elaborated and modified or dropped in favor of new values and standards. The social cognitive theory of morality is interactionist, positing the development of moral reasoning as a product of both the family and general society. Hence, because children are repeatedly exposed to the values and standards of conduct of not only their parents but those of their peers, possible siblings, as well as other adults that they have interaction with in their lives, they tend to develop values and standards that are composites of different features of their familial and social worlds. For instance, research into moral reasoning in individuals who were exposed to chronic childhood trauma has highlighted alterations in how they respond to moral dilemmas. In comparison to healthy women, women with posttraumatic stress disorder (PTSD) due to complex childhood trauma were less likely to approve utilitarian actions in dilemmas involving the infliction of direct physical harm.

== Interacting determinates ==
There are three interacting sources of influence; "behavior, cognition and other personal factors, and environmental factors". Moral conduct is thought to be regulated by the influence of thought and self-imposed sanctions, behavioral conduct, and the society one is a part of. Behavior itself can produce two sets of consequences, "self evaluative reactions and social effects" and these two consequences can be complementary or opposing influences on the behavior of an individual. Often, to increase the compatibility between the personal standards one holds and social standards, individuals will generally choose to interact with others who share their standards. Behavior itself is particularly influenced by external influences, especially in the absences of a strong internal standard. When this is the case, individuals can adopt a 'pragmatic' style, which makes it possible for them to fit their behavior to the situation they are in. It is also common for individuals' personal moral standards to come into conflict with societal pressures. However, it is possible for individuals to defend their actions with different types of moral reasoning, even in the face of participating in hurtful or detrimental behavior.

== See also ==
- Educational psychology
- Happy victimizing
- Moral disengagement
- Moral psychology
- Morality
