= Daniel Lapsley =

American developmental psychologist

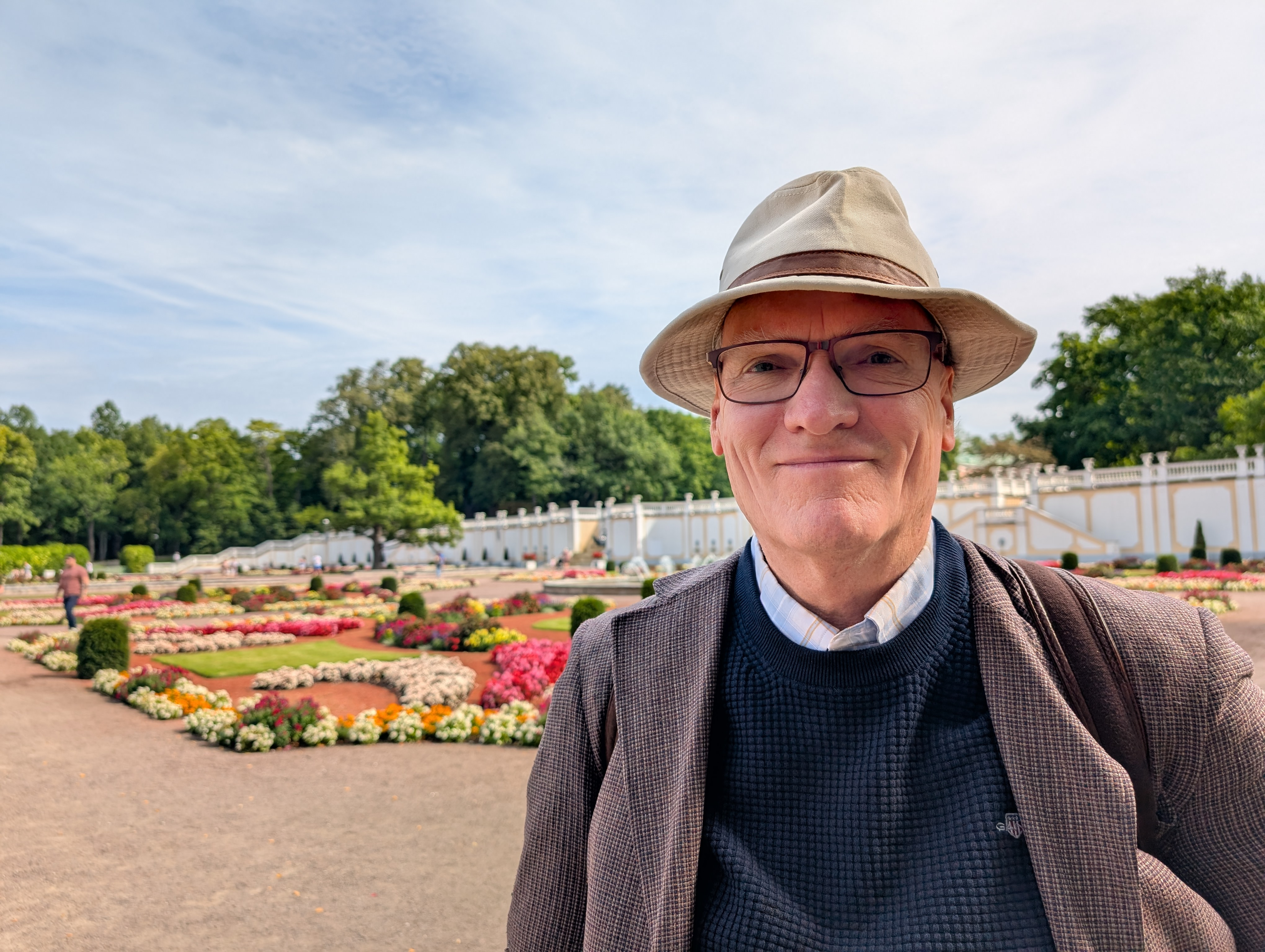
- Born: Daniel K. Lapsley
- Occupation: Psychologist
- Title: Professor Emeritus of Psychology

Academic background
- Education: Indiana University of Pennsylvania (BA); University of New Orleans (MS); University of Wisconsin–Madison (PhD)

Academic work
- Discipline: Psychology
- Sub-discipline: Developmental psychology, educational psychology, moral psychology
- Institutions: Brandon University; Ball State University; University of Notre Dame
- Main interests: Adolescent development, moral identity, character education
- Notable works: Moral Psychology (1996); Personality, Identity, and Character (2009)

Daniel K. Lapsley is an American developmental and educational psychologist who serves as Professor Emeritus of Psychology at the University of Notre Dame. He has authored or edited nine books including Personality, Identity, and Character: Explorations in Moral Psychology and Moral Psychology (1996). He is married to Darcia Narvaez, also a psychologist at Notre Dame.

== Education ==
Lapsley earned his Bachelor of Arts in psychology from Indiana University of Pennsylvania in 1977, his Master of Science in psychology from the University of New Orleans in 1979, and his Ph.D. in educational psychology and human development from the University of Wisconsin–Madison in 1982.

== Career ==
Before joining the University of Notre Dame, he held faculty appointments at Brandon University in Canada and at Ball State University, where he chaired the Department of Educational Psychology and served as interim director of charter school research.

At the University of Notre Dame, Lapsley joined the Department of Psychology in 1983, later serving as chair from 2009 to 2016. He has been affiliated with several interdisciplinary centers, including the Institute for Educational Initiatives and the Kroc Institute for International Peace Studies, and directed the Moral and Adolescent Psychology Laboratory (MAPLab). In July 2024, he was named Professor Emeritus.

== Research and scholarships ==
Lapsley’s scholarship explores adolescent risk behavior, invulnerability, separation–individuation, and the development of ego, identity, and moral character.

Through the Moral and Adolescent Psychology Lab (MAP Lab) at Notre Dame, he has developed scales such as the Adolescent Invulnerability Scale, the Subjective Omnipotence Scale, and the Personal Uniqueness Scale. He has also worked on instruments for assessing dysfunctional separation-individuation and explored narcissism as a normative component of adolescent personality development.

Another book, Personality, Identity, and Character: Explorations in Moral Psychology, bringstogether diverse empirical and philosophical perspectives on character education, moral personality, virtue, and the identity dimensions of moral conduct. Moral Psychology (1996) is one of his earlier works, offering a comprehensive analysis of moral cognition, reasoning, prosocial behavior, moral self, and developmental theories beyond Kohlberg’s stage-based models.

== Selected bibliography ==
- Lapsley, Daniel (2019-10-04), "Moral Formation in the Family", in Laible, Deborah J.; Carlo, Gustavo; Padilla-Walker, Laura M. (eds.), The Oxford Handbook of Parenting and Moral Development, Oxford University Press, pp. 392–418, doi:10.1093/oxfordhb/9780190638696.013.24, ISBN 978-0-19-063869-6
- Lapsley, Daniel; Carlo, Gustavo; Davis, Alexandra; Fabes, Richard; Laible, Deborah (2025-01-07). "Editorial: Promoting a kinder and more just world: the development of prosocial, moral, and social justice behaviors in adolescence". Frontiers in Developmental Psychology. 2 1536381. doi:10.3389/fdpys.2024.1536381. ISSN 2813-7779.
- Narvaez, Darcia; Lapsley, Daniel K., eds. (2009-06-29). Personality, Identity, and Character. Cambridge University Press. doi:10.1017/cbo9780511627125. ISBN 978-0-521-89507-1.
- Power, F. Clark; Lapsley, Daniel K., eds. (2005). Character Psychology And Character Education. University of Notre Dame Press. doi:10.1353/book.129719. ISBN 978-0-268-20287-3.
- Lapsley, Daniel; Reilly, Timothy S.; Narvaez, Darcia F. (2020-02-05), "Moral Self-Identity and Character Development", The Oxford Handbook of Moral Development, Oxford University Press, pp. 683–707, doi:10.1093/oxfordhb/9780190676049.013.40, ISBN 978-0-19-067604-9
- Lapsley, Daniel K. (2018-10-08). Moral Psychology. Routledge. ISBN 978-0-429-97845-6.
- Power, F. Clark (1992). Challenge of Pluralism: Education, Politics, and Values. Daniel K. Lapsley (1st ed.). Notre Dame, IN: University of Notre Dame Press. ISBN 978-0-268-00788-1.
- Lapsley, Daniel K.; Power, F. Clark (2012-12-12). Self, Ego, and Identity: Integrative Approaches. Springer New York. ISBN 978-1-4615-7836-9.
