= Values education =

Process by which people give moral values to each other

Values education is the process by which people give moral values to each other. According to Powney et al. It can be an activity that can take place in any human organization. During which people are assisted by others, who may be older, in a condition experienced to make explicit our ethics to assess the effectiveness of these values and associated behavior for their own and others' long-term well-being, and to reflect on and acquire other values and behavior which they recognize as being more effective for long-term well-being of self and others. There is a difference between literacy and education.

There has been very little reliable research on the results of values education classes, but there are some encouraging preliminary results.

One definition refers to it as the process that gives young people an initiation into values, giving knowledge of the rules needed to function in this mode of relating to other people and to seek the development in the student a grasp of certain underlying principles, together with the ability to apply these rules intelligently, and to have the settled disposition to do so Some researchers use the concept values education as an umbrella of concepts that include moral education and citizenship education instead. Values education topics can address to varying degrees are character, moral development, Religious Education, Spiritual development, citizenship education, personal development, social development and cultural development.

There is a further distinction between explicit values education and implicit values education where:

- explicit values education is associated with those different pedagogies, methods, or programs that teachers or educators use to create learning experiences for students when it comes to value questions.

Another definition of value education is "learning about self and wisdom of life" in a self-exploratory, systematic, and scientific way through formal education. According to C.V. Good, value education is the aggregate of all the processes by means of which a person develops abilities and other forms of behavior that reflect the positive values of the society in which he lives.

== Commonality in many "educations" ==
Moral education

Morals, as socio-legal-religious norms, are meant to help people behave responsibly. However, not all morals lead to responsible behavior. Values education can show which morals are "bad" and which are "good". The behavior change comes from confusing questions about right and wrong.

American psychologist Lawrence Kohlberg who specialized in research on moral education and reasoning, and was best known for his theory of stages of moral development and believed that children needed to be in an environment that allowed for open, public discussion of day-to-day conflicts and problems to develop their moral reasoning.

Teacher education

Cross has begun documenting some teacher-training attempts.

== Multinational school-based values education schemes ==
=== Living Values Education Programme ===
This project of worldwide proportions inspired by the new religious movement called the Brahma Kumaris World Spiritual University incorporates twelve values (unity, peace, happiness, hope, humility, simplicity, trust, freedom, co-operation, honesty, courage, love), and has formed the basis of the whole-school ethos approach in schools such as West Kidlington Primary School, Kidlington whose head master, Neil Hawkes, and Values education coordinators, Linda Heppenstall, used the work and other programs to help them form a values-based school. The Living Values Education Programme website lists 54 countries where values education projects are undertaken.

=== Human Values Foundation ===
The Human Values Foundation was established in 1995 to make a comprehensive, values-themed program for children aged 4 to 12, entitled "Education in Human Values," available worldwide. Its fully resourced lesson plans utilize familiar teaching techniques of discussion, storytelling, quotations, group singing, activities to reinforce learning, and times of quiet reflection. Following the success of "EHV", a second program was published. Social and Emotional Education ("SEE"), primarily for ages 12 to 14+, but it has also proved constructive for older children identified as likely to benefit from help getting their lives back on track. The programs enable children and young people to explore and put into practice a wide spectrum of values that can enrich their lives. Through experiential learning, participants develop a well-considered personal morality over time, all the while gaining invaluable emotional and social skills to help them lead happy, fulfilled, and successful lives.

=== Character education ===
Character education is an umbrella term for teaching children in ways that help them develop as personal and social beings. However, this definition requires research to explain what is meant by "personal and social being". Concepts that fall under this term include social and emotional learning, moral reasoning/cognitive development, life skills education, health education, violence prevention, critical thinking, ethical reasoning, and conflict resolution and mediation. Lickona (1996) mentions eleven principles of successful character education. It seems to have been applied in the UK and the United States

=== Science of Living ===
Science of Living (Jeevan Vigyan; Jeevan = Life and Vigyan = Science) is a comprehensive program that complements the current educational approach by integrating spiritual and value-based learning. While both mental and physical development are needed for a student's growth, Jeevan Vigyan adds a third pillar – that of emotional intelligence and morality (or values) – to education in schools and colleges. A combination of theory and practice, Jeevan Vigyan draws on findings from various life sciences and nutritional sciences. Our parasympathetic nervous system and endocrine system are known to drive our emotions and behavior. The Science of Living can influence these biological centers through a system of yogic exercises, breathing exercises, meditation, and contemplation. The inspiration for Science of Living comes from Jain Acharya Ganadhipati Shri Tulsi (1914–1997). His thoughts were further developed and expanded by Acharya Shri Mahapragya (1920–2010). Currently, Muni Shri Kishan Lal Ji, under the leadership of Acharya Shri Mahashraman, is the Principal of SOL.

== Examples of values education from around the world ==
Taylor gives a thorough overview of values education in 26 European countries.

=== Australia ===
The Australian government currently funds Values education in its schools, with its own publications and funding for school forums on values education at all levels. It also helps in becoming a better person. A conference on "Moral Education and Australian Values" was held in 2007 at Monash University.

=== India ===
The Indian Government currently promotes values education in its schools. The Ministry of Education has taken a strong step to instill values in schools and teacher training centers.

=== Indonesia ===
A key feature of education in Indonesia is the five principles of Pancasila.

=== Japan ===
Elementary and middle school students from first to ninth grade will be taught the importance of life, of listening to others with different opinions, of being fair, of respecting their country, and of learning about foreign cultures.

=== Singapore ===
Teacher training institutions in Singapore all have curricula for learning to teach civics and moral education. Still, students do not take them as seriously as they should because assessments are insufficient. The reason has been said to be the lack of innovative teaching approaches, such as discourse pedagogy.

=== Slovenia ===
There is an obligatory school subject that includes aspects of values education, Citizenship, Culture, and Ethics. It is taught in the 7th or 8th grade of primary school. Besides this, two elective subjects partly deal with values education: Religions and Ethics (for 7th, 8th, and 9th grade) and Philosophy for children (Critical thinking, Ethical exploring, Me and the other; for 7th, 8th, and 9th grade). The Slovenian educational system does not require special training in values education for teachers of the mentioned subjects.

=== Sweden ===
Values education is a part of Swedish schools. Whereas the formal curricula aim to educate students to become competent democratic citizens through student participation, qualitative studies have shown that, in everyday school life, values education and school democracy often appear reduced to traditional disciplining, with a strong focus on rules and regulations. This, in turn, evokes some critiques among students. Most research on values education in Sweden is done by qualitative methods, especially ethnographic or field studies, as well as focus group and interview studies. Some studies have been conducted by survey and other quantitative methods. In addition, theoretical work with roots in Dewey and Habermas has been done on deliberative democracy and deliberative conversations in schools.

=== Thailand ===
In Thailand, values have traditionally been taught within the context of Buddhist religious education. Since 1982, there has been a revival of applied values as an extracurricular activity suitable for Buddhist, Muslim, and Christian students alike, preparing Thai students for the effects of globalization.

=== United Kingdom ===
Since 1988, the British government, although not recognizing or calling it "values education," has promoted and respected values in the guise of spiritual, moral, social, and cultural development (SMSCD), leaving individual schools to decide how to meet values education standards. It is not clear whether there are standards for values education.

The Government and state school systems have never called it "values education". Values education courses in Britain may be implemented through government-supported campaigns such as Social & Emotional Aspects of Learning (SEAL, but are more often provided by local experts in the form of Living Values Education Program.

One headteacher in Cornwall has achieved national recognition for his work on character development and "virtues", at Kehelland Village School, based on Baha'i teachings. He was asked to develop the primary section of the University of Birmingham's Character Education pack for use with the national curriculum.

== See also ==
- Catechesis
- Democratic education
- Educational psychology
- Emotional and behavioral disorders
- Ethics
- Holistic education
- Moral psychology
- Political philosophy
- Preschool
- Social psychology
- Socialization
- Society for Values in Higher Education
- Sociology
- Special education
- Value (ethics)
