= Character education =

Umbrella term used to describe a variety of educational systems

Character education is an umbrella term loosely used to describe the teaching of children and adults in a manner that will help them develop variously as moral, civic, good, mannered, behaved, non-bullying, healthy, critical, successful, traditional, compliant or socially acceptable beings. Moral education relates specifically to education in moral concepts and appropriate behaviours.

Concepts which have fallen under the term "character education", now or in the past, include social and emotional learning, moral reasoning and cognitive development, life skills education, health education, violence prevention, critical thinking, ethical reasoning, and conflict resolution and mediation.

Many of these are now considered failed programs, i.e. "religious education", "moral development", and "values clarification".

Today, there are dozens of character education programs in, and vying for adoption by, schools and businesses. Some are commercial, some non-profit and many are uniquely devised by states, districts and schools, themselves. A common approach of these programs is to provide a list of principles, pillars, values or virtues, which are memorized or around which themed activities are planned. It is commonly claimed that the values included in any particular list are universally recognized. However, there is no agreement among the competing programs on core values (e.g., honesty, stewardship, kindness, generosity, courage, freedom, justice, equality, and respect) or even how many to list. There is also no common or standard means for assessing, implementing or evaluating programs.

== Terminology ==
"Character" is an overarching concept which is the subject of disciplines ranging from philosophy to theology, from psychology to sociology. There are many competing and conflicting theories. Thomas Lickona defines character education as "the deliberate effort to develop virtues that are good for the individual and good for society". More recently, psychologist Robert McGrath has proposed that character education is less focused on social skill acquisition and more on constructing a moral identity within a life narrative.

Character as it relates to character education most often refers to how "good" a person is. In other words, a person who exhibits personal qualities like those a society considers desirable might be considered to have good character—and developing such personal qualities is often seen as a purpose of education. However, the various proponents of character education are far from agreement as to what "good" is, or what qualities are desirable. Compounding this problem is that there is no scientific definition of character. Because such a concept blends personality and behavioral components, scientists have long since abandoned use of the term "character" and, instead, use the term psychological motivators to measure the behavioral predispositions of individuals. With no clinically defined meaning, there is virtually no way to measure if an individual has a deficit of character, or if a school program can improve it.

The various terms in the lists of values that character education programs propose—even those few found in common among some programs—suffer from vague definitions. This makes the need and effectiveness of character education problematic to measure.

== In-school programs ==
There is no common practice in schools in relation to the formation of pupils' character or values education. This is partly due to the many competing programs and the lack of standards in character education, but also because of how and by whom the programs are executed.

Programs are generally of four varieties: cheerleading, praise and reward, define and drill, and forced formality. They may be used alone or in combination.

1) Cheerleading involves multicolored posters, banners, and bulletin boards featuring a value or virtue of the month; lively morning public-address announcements; occasional motivational assemblies; and possibly a high-profile event such as a fund-raiser for a good cause.

2) Praise-and-reward approach seeks to make virtue into habit using "positive reinforcement". Elements include "catching students being good" and praising them or giving them chits that can be exchanged for privileges or prizes. In this approach, all too often, the real significance of the students' actions is lost, as the reward or award becomes the primary focus.

3) Define-and-drill calls on students to memorize a list of values and the definition of each. Students' simple memorization of definitions seems to be equated with their development of the far more complex capacity for making moral decisions.

4) Forced-formality focuses on strict, uniform compliance with specific rules of conduct, (i.e., walking in lines, arms at one's sides), or formal forms of address ("yes sir," "no ma'am"), or other procedures deemed to promote order or respect of adults.

"These four approaches aim for quick behavioral results, rather than helping students better understand and commit to the values that are core to our society, or helping them develop the skills for putting those values into action in life's complex situations."

Generally, the most common practitioners of character education in the United States are school counselors, although there is a growing tendency to include other professionals in schools and the wider community. Depending on the program, the means of implementation may be by teachers and/or any other adults (faculty, bus drivers, cafeteria workers, maintenance staff, etc.); by storytelling, which can be through books and media; or by embedding into the classroom curriculum. There are many theories about means, but no comparative data and no consensus in the industry as to what, if any, approach may be effective.

== History ==
It has been said that "character education is as old as education itself". Indeed, the attempt to understand and develop character extends into prehistory.

=== Understanding character ===
==== Psychic arts ====
Since very early times, people have tried to access or "read" the pre-disposition (character) of self and others. Being able to predict and even manipulate human behavior, motivations, and reactions would bestow obvious advantages. Pre-scientific character assessment techniques have included, among others: anthropometry, astrology, palmistry, and metoposcopy. These approaches have been scientifically discredited although they continue to be widely practiced.

==== Race character ====
The concept of inherited "race character" has long been used to characterize desirable versus undesirable qualities in members of groups as a whole along national, tribal, ethnic, religious and even class lines. Race character is predominantly used as a justification for the denigration and subsequent persecution of minority groups, most infamously, justifying European persecution of Native Americans, the concept of slavery, and the Nazis' persecution of Jews. Though race character continues to be used as a justification for persecution of minorities worldwide, it has been scientifically discredited and is not overtly a component of modern character education in western societies.

==== Generational character ====
Particularly in modern liberal republics, social and economic change is rapid and can result in cognitive stress to older generations when each succeeding generation expands on and exhibits their own modes of expressing the freedoms such societies enjoy.

America is a prime example. With few traditions, each generation exhibits attitudes and behaviors that conservative segments of preceding generations uneasily assimilate. Individual incidents can also produce a moral panic. Cries about loss of morals in the succeeding generation, overwhelmingly unsubstantiated, and calls for remediation have been constant in America since before its founding. (It should be expected that—in a free country that supports children's rights—this trend will continue apace.)

=== Developing character ===
==== Eastern philosophy ====
Eastern philosophy views the nature of man as initially quiet and calm, but when affected by the external world, it develops desires. When the desires are not properly controlled and the conscious mind is distracted by the material world, we lose our true selves and the principle of reason in Nature is destroyed. From this arise rebellion, disobedience, cunning and deceit, and general immorality. This is the way of chaos. Confucianism stands with Taoism as two of the great religious/philosophical systems of China.

A hallmark of the philosophy of Confucius is his emphasis on tradition and study. He disparages those who have faith in natural understanding or intuition and argues for long and careful study. Study, for Confucius, means finding a good teacher, who is familiar with the ways of the past and the practices of the ancients, imitating his words and deeds. The result is a heavy scheme of obligations and intricate duties throughout all of one's many social roles. Confucius is said to have sung his sayings and accompanied himself on a 'qin' (a kind of zither). According to Confucius, musical training is the most effective method for molding the moral character of man and keeping society in order. He said: "Let a man be stimulated by poetry, established by the rules of propriety, perfected by music."

The theme of Taoism is one of harmony with nature. Zhuangzi was a central figure in Taoist philosophy. He wrote that people develop different moral attitudes from different natural upbringings, each feeling that his own views are obvious and natural, yet all are blinded by this socialization to their true nature. To Zhuangzi, pre-social desires are relatively few and easy to satisfy, but socialization creates a plethora of desires for "social goods" such as status, reputation, and pride. These conventional values, because of their comparative nature create attitudes of resentment and anger inciting competition and then violence. The way to social order is for people to eliminate these socialized ambitions through open-minded receptivity to all kinds of voices—particularly those who have run afoul of human authority or seem least authoritative. Each has insights. Indeed, in Taoist moral philosophy, perfection may well look like its opposite to us. One theme of Zhuangzi's that links Taoism to the Zen branch of Buddhism is the concept of flow, of losing oneself in activity, particularly the absorption in skilled execution of a highly cultivated way. His most famous example concerns a butcher who carves beef with the focus and absorption of a virtuoso dancer in an elegantly choreographed performance. The height of human satisfaction comes in achieving and exercising such skills with the focus and commitment that gets us "outside ourselves" and into such an intimate connection with our inborn nature.

==== Western philosophy ====
The early Greek philosophers argued that happiness requires virtue and hence that a happy person must have virtuous traits of character.

Socrates identifies happiness with pleasure and explains the various virtues as instrumental means to pleasure. He teaches, however, that pleasure is to be understood in an overarching sense wherein fleeing battle is a momentary pleasure that detracts from the greater pleasure of acting bravely.

Plato wrote that to be virtuous, we must both understand what contributes to our overall good and have our spirited and appetitive desires educated properly and guided by the rational part of the soul. The path he prescribes is that a potentially virtuous person should learn when young to love and take pleasure in virtuous actions, but he must wait until late in life to develop the understanding of why what he loves is good. An obvious problem is that this reasoning is circular.

Aristotle is perhaps, even today, the most influential of all the early Western philosophers. His view is often summarized as 'moderation in all things'. For example, courage is worthy, for too little of it makes one defenseless. But too much courage can result in foolhardiness in the face of danger. To be clear, Aristotle emphasizes that the moderate state is not an arithmetic mean, but one relative to the situation: sometimes the mean course is to be angry at, say, injustice or mistreatment, at other times anger is wholly inappropriate. Additionally, because people are different, the mean for one person may be bravery, but for another it is recklessness.

For Aristotle, the key to finding this balance is to enjoy and recognize the value of developing one's rational powers, and then using this recognition to determine which actions are appropriate in which circumstances.

The views of nineteenth-century philosophers were heavily indebted to these early Greeks. Two such philosophers, Karl Marx and John Stuart Mill, had a major influence on approaches to developing character.

Karl Marx applies Aristotle's conclusions in his understanding of work as a place where workers should be able to express their rational powers. But workers subject to capitalist values are characterized primarily by material self-interest. This makes them distrustful of others, viewing them primarily as competitors. Given these attitudes, workers become prone to a number of vices, including selfishness, cowardice, and intemperance.

To correct these conditions, he proposes that workers perform tasks that are interesting and mentally challenging—and that each worker help decide how, and to what ends, their work should be directed. Marx believes that this, coupled with democratic conditions in the workplace, reduces competitive feelings among workers so they want to exhibit traditional virtues like generosity and trustfulness, and avoid the more traditional vices such as cowardice, stinginess, and self-indulgence.

John Stuart Mill, like Marx, also highly regarded development of the rational mind. He argued that seriously unequal societies, by preventing individuals from developing their deliberative powers, affect individuals' character in unhealthy ways and impede their ability to live virtuous lives. In particular, Mill argued that societies that have systematically subordinated women have harmed men and women, and advised that the place of women in families and in societies be reconsidered.

==== The American colonial period ====
As common schools spread throughout the colonies, the moral education of children was taken for granted. Formal education had a distinctly moral and religion emphasis. In the Christian tradition, it is believed that humans are flawed at birth (original sin), requiring salvation through religious means: teaching, guidance and supernatural rituals. This belief in America, originally heavily populated by Protestant immigrants, creates a situation of a-priori assumption that humans are morally deficient by nature and that preemptive measures are needed to develop children into acceptable members of society: home, church and school.

Character education in schools in the early United States began with the circulation of the New England Primer. Besides rudimentary instruction in reading, it was filled with Biblical quotes, prayers, catechisms and religiously charged moral exhortations. Typical is this short verse from the 1777 edition:

Good children must,
Fear God all day, Love Christ alway,
Parents obey, In secret pray,
No false thing say, Mind little play,
By no sin stray, Make no delay,
In doing good.

==== Nineteenth century ====
In the United States, as the young republic took shape, schooling was promoted for both secular and moral reasons. By the time of the nineteenth century, however, religion became a problem in the schools. The overwhelming dominant religion was Protestantism. While not as prominent as during the Puritan era, the King James Bible was, nevertheless, a staple of U.S. public schools. Yet, as waves of immigrants from Ireland, Germany, and Italy came to the country from the mid-nineteenth century forward, they reacted to the Protestant tone and orthodoxy of the schools. Concerned that their children would be weaned from their faith, Catholics developed their own school system. Later in the twentieth century, other religious groups, such as Jews, Muslims, and even various Protestant denominations, formed their own schools. Each group desired, and continues to desire, that its moral education be rooted in its respective faith or code.

Horace Mann, the nineteenth-century champion of the common schools, strongly advocated for moral education. He and his followers were worried by the widespread drunkenness, crime, and poverty during the Jacksonian period they lived in. No less troubling were the waves of immigrants flooding into cities, unprepared for urban life and particularly unprepared to participate in democratic civic life.

The most successful textbooks during the nineteenth and early twentieth centuries were the famed McGuffey Readers, fostering virtues such as thrift honesty, piety, punctuality and industry. McGuffey was a theological and conservative teacher and attempted to give schools a curriculum that would instill Presbyterian Calvinist beliefs and manners in their students.

=== Modern character education ===
During the late-nineteenth-century and twentieth-century period, intellectual leaders and writers were deeply influenced by the ideas of the English naturalist Charles Darwin, the German political philosopher Karl Marx, the Austrian neurologist and founder of psychoanalysis Sigmund Freud, and by a growing strict interpretation of the separation of church and state doctrine. This trend increased after World War II and was further intensified by what appeared to be changes in the nation's moral consensus in the late 1960s. Educators and others became wary of using the schools for moral education. More and more this was seen to be the province of the family and the church.

Still, due to a perceived view of academic and moral decline, educators continued to receive mandates to address the moral concerns of students, which they did using primarily two approaches: values clarification and cognitive developmental moral education.

Values clarification. Values change over time in response to changing life experiences. Recognizing these changes and understanding how they affect one's actions and behaviors is the goal of the values clarification process. Values clarification does not tell you what you should have, it simply provides the means to discover what your values are. This approach, although widely practiced, came under strong criticism for, among other things, promoting moral relativism among students.

Cognitive-developmental theory of moral education and development sprang from the work of the Swiss psychologist Jean Piaget and was further developed by Lawrence Kohlberg. Kohlberg rejected the focus on values and virtues, not only due to the lack of consensus on what virtues are to be taught, but also because of the complex nature of practicing such virtues. For example, people often make different decisions yet hold the same basic moral values. Kohlberg believed a better approach to affecting moral behavior should focus on stages of moral development. These stages are critical, as they consider the way a person organizes their understanding of virtues, rules, and norms, and integrates these into a moral choice.

Because women and men today may not be well-positioned to fully develop the capacities which Aristotle and others considered central to virtuous character, it continues to be a central issue not only in ethics, but also in feminist philosophy, political philosophy, philosophy of education, and philosophy of literature. Because moral character requires communities where citizens can fully realize their human powers and ties of friendship, there are hard questions of how educational, economic, political, and social institutions should be structured to make that development possible.

==== Situationism ====
Impressed by scientific experiments in social psychology, "situationist" philosophers argue that character traits are not stable or consistent and cannot be used to explain why people act as they do. Experimental data shows that much of human behavior is attributable to seemingly trivial features of the situations in which people find themselves. In a typical experiment, seminary students agreed to give a talk on the importance of helping those in need. On the way to the building where their talks were to be given, they encountered a confederate slumped over and groaning. Ironically, those who were told they were already late were much less likely to help than those who were told they had time to spare.

==== Experimentation ====
Perhaps most damning to the traditional view of character are the results of the experiments conducted by Stanley Milgram in the 1960s and Philip G. Zimbardo in 1971. In the first of these experiments, the great majority of subjects, when politely though firmly requested by an experimenter, were willing to administer what they thought were increasingly severe electric shocks to a screaming "victim". In the second, the infamous Stanford prison experiment, the planned two-week investigation into the psychology of prison life had to be ended after only six days because the college students who were assigned to act as guards became sadistic and those who were the "prisoners" became depressed and showed signs of extreme stress. These and other experiments are taken to show that if humans do have noble tendencies, they are narrow, "local" traits that are not unified with other traits into a wider behavioral pattern of being.

==== Religious perspectives ====
The Second Vatican Council in 1965 issued a Declaration on Christian Education which reiterated the teaching of the Catholic Church on the right to education, adding that moral education was a key aspect of this right:

Children and young people have a right to be motivated to appraise moral values with a right conscience, to embrace them with a personal adherence, together with a deeper knowledge and love of God.

==== The character education movement of the 1980s ====
The impetus and energy behind the return of a more didactic character education to American schools did not come from within the educational community. It continues to be fueled by desire from conservative and religious segments of the population for traditionally orderly schools where conformity to "standards" of behavior and good habits are stressed. State and national politicians, as well as local school districts, lobbied by character education organizations, have responded by supporting this sentiment. During his presidency, Bill Clinton hosted five conferences on character education. President George W. Bush expanded on the programs of the previous administration and made character education a major focus of his educational reform agenda.

==== 21st century developments ====
Grit may be defined as perseverance and commitment to long-term goals. It is a character attribute associated with University of Pennsylvania professor Angela Duckworth who wrote about her research in a best-selling book and promoted it on a widely watched Ted Talks video. Initially, lauded as a breakthrough discovery of the "key character ingredient" to success and performance, it soon came under wide criticism and has been exposed, like other character interventions, as suspect as a character construct, and where attempts have been made to implement it in school programs, shows no more than a weak effect, if any. Moreover, the original data was misinterpreted by Duckworth. Additionally, the construct of grit ability ignores the positive socio-economic pre-requisites necessary to deploy it.

=== Modern scientific approaches ===
Today, the sciences of social psychology, neuropsychology and evolutionary psychology have taken new approaches to the understanding of human social behavior.

Personality and social psychology is a scientific method used by health professionals for researching personal and social motivators in and between the individual and society, as well as applying them to the problems people have in the context of society. Personality and social psychologists study how people think about, influence, and relate to one another. By exploring forces within the person (such as traits, attitudes, and goals) as well as forces within the situation (such as social norms and incentives), they seek to provide insight into issues as wide-ranging as prejudice, romantic attraction, persuasion, friendship, helping, aggression, conformity, and group interaction.

Neuropsychology addresses how brain regions associated with emotional processing are involved in moral cognition by studying the biological mechanisms that underlie human choices and behavior. Like social psychology, it seeks to determine, not how we should, but how we do behave—though neurologically. For instance, what happens in the brain when we favor one response over another, or when it is difficult to make any decision? Studies of clinical populations, including patients with ventromedial prefrontal cortex damage (VMPC), reveal an association between impairments in emotional processing and impairments in moral judgement and behavior. These and other studies conclude that not only are emotions engaged during moral cognition, but that emotions, particularly those mediated by VMPC, are in fact critical for morality.

Other neurological research is documenting how much the unconscious mind is involved in decision making. According to cognitive neuroscientists, we are conscious of only about 5 percent of our cognitive activity, so most of our decisions, actions, emotions, and behavior depends on the 95 percent of brain activity that goes beyond our conscious awareness. These studies show that actions come from preconscious brain activity patterns and not from people consciously thinking about what they are going to do. A 2011 study conducted by Itzhak Fried found that individual neurons fire 2 seconds before a reported "will" to act (long before EEG activity predicted such a response). This was accomplished with the help of volunteer epilepsy patients, who needed electrodes implanted deep in their brain for evaluation and treatment anyway. Similarly to these tests, a 2013 study found that the choice to sum or subtract can be predicted before the subject reports it.

Evolutionary psychology, a new science, emerged in the 1990s to focus on explaining human behavior against the backdrop of Darwinian processes. This science considers how the biological forces of genetics and neurotransmissions in the brain influence unconscious strategies and conscious and proposes that these features of biology have developed through evolution processes. In this view, the cognitive programs of the human brain are adaptations. They exist because this behavior in our ancestors enabled them to survive and reproduce these same traits in their descendants, thereby equipping us with solutions to problems that our ancestors faced during our species' evolutionary history. Ethical topics addressed include altruistic behaviors, deceptive or harmful behaviors, an innate sense of fairness or unfairness, feelings of kindness or love, self-sacrifice, feelings related to competitiveness and moral punishment or retribution, and moral "cheating" or hypocrisy.

== Issues and controversies ==
=== Scientific studies ===
The largest American federal study to date, a 2010 report released under the auspices of the U.S. Department of Education, found that the vast majority of character education programs have failed to prove their effectiveness, producing no improvements in student behavior or academic performance. Previous and current research on the subject fails to find one peer-reviewed study demonstrating any scientifically validated need for or result from character education programs. Typically, support is attested to by referring to "correlations" (e.g., grades, number of disciplinary referrals, subjective opinion, etc.).

=== Functional and ideological problems ===
1) An assumption that "character" is deficient in some or all children

2) Lack of agreement on what constitutes effectiveness

3) Lack of evidence that it does what it claims

4) A conflict between what good character is and the way that character education proposes to teach it

5) Differing standards in methods and objectives. Differing standards for assessing need and evaluating results. Some attempts have been made.

6) Supportive "studies" that overwhelmingly rely on subjective feedback (usually surveys) from vested participants

7) Programs instituted towards ideological and/or religious ends

8) The pervasive problem of confusing morality with social conformity

9) There are few if any common goals among character education programs. The dissensions in the list of values among character education programs, itself, constitutes a major criticism that there is anything to character education that is either fundamental or universally relevant to students or society.

10) It could be said that there is agreement on which values are excluded from lists of core values. Values not found in the list , even though they are fundamental to the success of modern democratic societies, are values such as independence, inventiveness, curiosity, critical thinking, skepticism, and even moderation. The phrase "Take chances, make mistakes, get messy!" said by Ms. Frizzle in the television show, The Magic School Bus, embodies values which would be antithetical to those found on today's character education lists.

== See also ==
- Lawrence Kohlberg's stages of moral development
- Journal of Moral Education
- Moral character
- Moral development
- Moral emotions
- Moral enhancement
- Moral psychology
- Moral reasoning
- Social cognitive theory of morality
- Values education
