= Triune ethics theory =

Metatheory in moral psychology

The triune ethics theory (TET) is a metatheory in the field of moral psychology. It was proposed by Darcia Narvaez and inspired by Paul MacLean's triune brain model of brain development. TET highlights the relative contributions of biological inheritance (including human evolutionary adaptations), environmental influences on neurobiology, and culture to moral development and reasoning. TET proposes three ethics that are the foundation or motivation for all ethics: security (or safety), engagement, and imagination. They differ not only in the recency of evolutionary development but also in their relative capacity to override one another.

== The three ethics ==
=== Security ===
The security ethic is based in the oldest part of the brain, involving the R-complex or the extrapyramidal system. The security ethic is triggered stressors that activate primal instincts and fight-or-flight responses. These are concerned or centered on safety, survival, and thriving in an environment (or biological system). With these systems present at birth, the security ethic is conditioned during sensitive periods of development (such as infancy), life experience, and trauma. Studies have shown that a dearth of touch in early years result in an underdevelopment of serotonin receptors. Children with faulty serotonin receptors are susceptible to somatosensory affectional deprivation, a condition related to depression, violent behavior, and stimulus seeking. As an adult, if serotonin receptors are not properly functioning, an individual is more prone to depression and anxiety. If receptors are damaged, and one becomes fixated at this ethic, they can be seen as cold, closed-minded, and aggressive. This ethic is most responsible for racism and hate towards outside groups.

=== Engagement ===
The ethic of engagement is centered in the upper limbic system or the visceral-emotional nervous system. The limbic system allows for external and internal emotional signaling and is critical to emotion, identity, memory for ongoing experience, and an individual's sense of reality and truth. The ethic of engagement refers to relational attunement in the moment, which the stress response prevents, focusing on social bonding. It relies significantly on caregiver influence for its development in early childhood. The engagement ethic is strongly associated with the hormone oxytocin, which has a strong presence during breastfeeding between a mother and child. Oxytocin is essential for building the trust between mother and child.

=== Imagination ===
The imagination ethic allows a person to step away from the impetuous emotional responses of the older parts of the brain and consider alternative actions based on logic and reason. It is centered in the neocortex and related thalamic structures, including the frontal lobes used for reasoning and judgement skills. It is focused on the outside world and allows for the integration and coordination of the other parts of the brain to allow for imaginative thinking and strategic problem solving. The ethic of imagination involves integrating internal information with external information, allowing an adult to acknowledge and possibly reject more emotional responses from the security or engagement ethics. The imagination ethic can build on the self-protective states of the security ethic (vicious or detached imagination) or of the prosocial engagement ethic (communal imagination).

== Moral functioning ==
TET looks back to people in the Pleistocene era and the environment of evolutionary adaptedness (EEA), relating to their early-life supports and its relation to moral functioning. The long term breastfeeding, the constant holding or touching, the frequency of caregivers other than mother, multiage playgroups, and the quick responsiveness to cries during that era is the type of caregiving that supports our biological systems. Current caregiving such as hospital births, solo sleeping, and physical isolation are not the types of early life caregiving to which humans are adapted. TET also mentions "dearth of touch" or faulty serotonin receptors affects society, and how they affect our society. There are higher rates of depression and anxiety, which both affect general and moral functioning.

There are two categories of the effects of childrearing on moral functioning, dispositional and situational effects. There are two hypotheses relating to the dispositional effects of childrearing on moral functioning. First, "a personality may cohere around being more or less oriented to each of the three ethics". Second, "during critical periods of brain and personality development 'attachment' and 'trust' aspects of personality development are deeply influenced, affecting the structure and wiring of brain systems". Lastly, there are situational effects. These relate to the idea that "moral personality has a dispositional signature within particular situations: person and situation interact with dispositional regularity".

== Criticisms ==
Although not directed at TET specifically, Cesario et al. argue that the triune brain theory upon which TET is based provides an inaccurate account of brain evolution.
