= Journal of Moral Education =

- Discipline: Educational research
- Language: English
- Edited by: Kristján Kristjánsson

Publication details
- History: 1971–present
- Publisher: Taylor & Francis
- Frequency: Quarterly
- Impact factor: 0.825 (2017)

Standard abbreviations
- ISO 4: J. Moral Educ.

Indexing
- CODEN: JMEDFF
- ISSN: 0305-7240
- LCCN: 2001238179
- OCLC no.: 937345384

Links
- Journal homepage; Online access; Online archive

The Journal of Moral Education is a quarterly peer-reviewed academic journal covering the study of moral education and development. It was established in 1971 by the humanist philosopher Harold Blackham as part of the Social Morality Council, a project of the British Humanist Association. Since 2006 it has been published by Taylor & Francis.

The editor-in-chief is Kristján Kristjánsson (University of Birmingham). According to the Journal Citation Reports, the journal has a 2017 impact factor of 0.825, ranking it 183rd out of 238 journals in the category "Education & Educational Research".

== Collections ==
The Institute of Education, University College London holds the records of the journal between 1971 - 2012. The collection contains meeting minutes, promotional materials, correspondence and legal documentation.
