= Darcia Narvaez =

American psychologist

- Born: Darcia Fe Narvaez; June 8, 1952 (age 74); Minneapolis
- Education: University of Northern Colorado; University of Minnesota
- Known for: Moral development
- Scientific career
- Fields: Evolutionary Developmental Moral Psychology
- Workplaces: University of Notre Dame; University of Minnesota
- Thesis: (1993)
- Doctoral advisor: Paul van den Broek

Darcia Narvaez (dar-sha narv-eyes) is a Professor of Psychology Emerita at the University of Notre Dame who has written extensively on issues of character, moral development, and human flourishing.

== Biography ==
Narvaez was born in Minneapolis, Minnesota. Her father, Richard Narvaez, was a professor of Spanish linguistics at the University of Minnesota. Darcia Narvaez spent part of her childhood in Puerto Rico, Mexico, Colombia, and Spain. Her first job was with the local public television station (KTCA) in St. Paul, Minnesota, as a 8- and 9-year-old: she was the voice of the puppet, Maria, on the Spanish-language-teaching program Ya Hablamos Español.

Narvaez subsequently worked as a church musician (organist, choir director), classroom and private music teacher (Brent International School in Baguio, Philippines; King of Kings School in Roseville, Minnesota), middle school Spanish teacher (The Blake School in Hopkins, Minnesota), and business owner. She also earned a master of divinity degree from Luther Seminary in St. Paul and is a published poet.

Narvaez earned her PhD in educational psychology from the University of Minnesota in 1993 and joined the College of Education and Human Development there in the Department of Curriculum and Instruction and the Department of Educational Psychology. In 2000, she joined the Department of Psychology at Notre Dame.

Narvaez was married to Professor James Rest until his death in 1999. She is married to Daniel Lapsley, a professor of psychology at Notre Dame.

== Career ==
Narvaez was the design leader of the Minnesota Community Voices and Character Education project funded with $1 million by the US Department of Education during 1998–2002. She is co-author with James Rest, Steve Thoma and Muriel Bebeau of the book Postconventional Moral Thinking (1999).

Narvaez was one of five psychologists to be invited to speak at the White House's Conference on Character in Community in 2002.

In a 2020 analysis of the most cited scientists, Narvaez emerged in the most cited 2% of scientists worldwide.

Narvaez's work emphasizes moral development over a lifespan, and the interaction between implicit and explicit processes in moral functioning. She emphasizes the importance of early experience in shaping moral capacities. Her current work is on the evolved developmental niche for young children (natural birth, extensive on-demand breastfeeding, frequent affectionate touch, caregiver responsiveness, self-directed social free play, multiple adult caregivers and extensive positive social support). She studies the effects of early life experience on sociality, morality and thriving.

A recent emphasis in Narvaez's work involves indigenous wisdom, starting with her 2013 paper "The 99%--Development and socialization within an evolutionary context: Growing up to become 'A good and useful human being.'" She organized a conference in September 2016 called "Sustainable Wisdom: Integrating Indigenous Knowhow for Global Flourishing" resulting in the volume, Indigenous Sustainable Wisdom (2019). She and Four Arrows have a 2022 book, Restoring the Kinship Worldview.

In her work for the public, she hosts the website EvolvedNest.org which emphasizes the importance of nestedness for all ages in order to maintain wellbeing and compassionate morality. She has co-created several films, including Breaking the Cycle. Narvaez blogged for Psychology Today between 2009 and 2022, and currently writes a Substack blog called The Nested Pathway.

== Honors ==
Narvaez is a fellow of the American Psychological Association, the American Educational Research Association, the American Psychological Association and the American Association for the Advancement of Science. She is former editor-in-chief of the Journal of Moral Education.

Narvaez's book Neurobiology and the Development of Human Morality: Evolution, Culture and Wisdom won the 2015 William James Book Award from Division I of the American Psychological Association. It also won the 2017 Expanded Reason Award.

Several of Narvaez's books have won awards from the special interest group Moral Development and Education at the American Educational Research Association:

- Postconventional Moral Thinking (2000, which also won the book award from AERA Division I);
- Moral Development, Self and Identity (2007);
- Handbook of Moral and Character Education (2009);
- Personality, Character and Identity: Explorations in Moral Psychology (2011);
- Neurobiology and the Development of Human Morality: Evolution, Culture and Wisdom (2016).

== Selected publications ==
=== Books ===
- Narvaez, D., & Bradshaw, G.A. (August 2023). The Evolved Nest: Nature's Way Of Raising Children And Creating Connected Communities. North Atlantic Books.
- Reilly, T., Narvaez, D., Graves, M., Kaikhosroshvili, K., & de Souza, S.I. (2022). Moral and Intellectual Virtue in Practice: Understanding Virtue Through the Eyes of Scientists and Musicians. Palgrave-MacMillan.
- Wahinkpe Topa (Four Arrows), & Narvaez, D. (2022). Restoring the kinship worldview: Indigenous voices introduce 28 precepts for rebalancing life on planet earth. North Atlantic Books.
- Snow, N., & Narvaez, D. (Eds.) (2019). Self, motivation and virtue: Interdisciplinary perspectives. Routledge.
- Deane-Drummond, C., Stapleford, T.A., & Narvaez, D. (2019). Practicing science: Virtues, values, and the good life. Notre Dame, IN: Center for Theology, Science and Human Flourishing. Available at https://virtueandthepracticeofscience.pressbooks.com/
- Narvaez, D., Four Arrows, Halton, E., Collier, B., Enderle, G. (Eds.) (2019). Indigenous Sustainable Wisdom: First Nation Know-how for Global Flourishing. New York: Peter Lang.
- Narvaez, D. (Ed.) (2018). Basic needs, wellbeing and morality: Fulfilling human potential. New York: Palgrave-MacMillan.
- Narvaez, D. (2016). Embodied Morality: Protectionism, Engagement and Imagination. London, UK: Palgrave Macmillan.
- Annas, J., Narvaez, D., & Snow, N. (Eds.) (2016). Developing the Virtues: Integrating Perspectives. New York: Oxford University Press.
- Narvaez, D., Braungart-Rieker, J., Miller-Graff, L., Gettler, L., & Hastings, P. (2016). "Contexts for Young Child Flourishing: Evolution, Family, and Society." New York: Oxford University Press.
- Narvaez, D. (2014). "Neurobiology and the development of human morality: Evolution, culture and wisdom". New York: W.W. Norton.
- Narvaez, D., Valentino, K., Fuentes, A., McKenna, J., & Gray, P. (2014). "Ancestral Landscapes in Human Evolution: Culture, Childrearing and Social Wellbeing". New York: Oxford University Press.
- Nucci, L. P., Narvaez, D., & Krettenauer, T. (Eds.) (2014). Handbook of Moral and Character Education, Second Ed.. New York: Routledge.
- Narvaez, D., Panksepp, J., Schore, A., & Gleason, T. (Eds.) (2013). Evolution, Early Experience and Human Development: From Research to Practice and Policy. New York: Oxford University Press.
- Narvaez, D., & Lapsley, D.K. (Eds.) (2009). Personality, Identity, and Character: Explorations in Moral Psychology. New York: Cambridge University Press.
- Narvaez, D., & Endicott, L. (2009). Nurturing Character in the Classroom, EthEx Series, Book 1: Ethical Sensitivity. Notre Dame, IN: ACE Press.
- Narvaez, D. & Bock, T. (2009). Nurturing Character in the Classroom, EthEx Series, Book 2: Ethical Judgment. Notre Dame, IN: ACE Press.
- Narvaez, D. & Lies, J. (2009). Nurturing Character in the Classroom, EthEx Series, Book 3: Ethical Motivation. Notre Dame, IN: ACE Press.
- Narvaez, D. (2009). Nurturing Character in the Classroom, EthEx Series, Book 4: Ethical Action. Notre Dame, IN: ACE Press.
- Nucci, L. P., & Narvaez, D. (Eds.) (2008). Handbook of Moral and Character Education. New York: Routledge.
- Power, F. C., Nuzzi, R. J., Narvaez, D., Lapsley, D. K., & Hunt, T. C. (Eds.). (2008). Moral education: A handbook (Vols. 1–2). Westport, CT: Praeger.
- Lapsley, D.K., & Narvaez, D. (Eds.) (2004). Moral development, self and identity: Essays in honor of Augusto Blasi. Mahwah, NJ: Erlbaum.
- Rest, J. R., Narvaez, D., Bebeau, M., & Thoma, S. (1999). Postconventional moral thinking: A neo-Kohlbergian approach. Mahwah, NJ: Erlbaum.
- Rest, J.R. & Narvaez, D. (Eds.) (1994). Moral development in the professions: Psychology and applied ethics. Hillsdale, NJ: Lawrence Erlbaum.

=== Peer-reviewed papers ===
- Narvaez, D., Lapsley, D. K., Hagele, S., & Lasky, B. (2006). Moral chronicity and social information processing: Tests of a social cognitive approach to the moral personality. Journal of Research in Personality, 40, 966–985.
- Narvaez, D.(2008). Triune ethics: The neurobiological roots of our multiple moralities. New Ideas in Psychology, 26, 95–119.
- Narvaez, D. (2010). Moral complexity: The fatal attraction of truthiness and the importance of mature moral functioning. Perspectives on Psychological Science, 5(2), 163–181.
- Narvaez, D. (2010). The embodied dynamism of moral becoming. Perspectives on Psychological Science, 5(2), 185–186.
- Narvaez, D. (2010). The emotional foundations of high moral intelligence. In B. Latzko & T. Malti (Eds.). Children's Moral Emotions and Moral Cognition: Developmental and Educational Perspectives, New Directions for Child and Adolescent Development, 129, 77–94. San Francisco: Jossey-Bass.
- Narvaez, D., Gleason, T., & Mitchell, C. (2010). Moral virtue and practical wisdom: Theme comprehension in children, youth and adults. Journal of Genetic Psychology, 171(4),1-26.
- Narvaez, D. (15 May 2011). "Moral Neuroeducation from Early Life Through the Lifespan". Neuroethics. 5 (2). Springer Science and Business Media LLC: 145–157. doi:10.1007/s12152-011-9117-5. ISSN 1874-5490. S2CID 255505729.
- Narvaez, D., Wang, L., Gleason, T., Cheng, A., Lefever, J., & Deng, L. (2013). The Evolved Developmental Niche and sociomoral outcomes in Chinese three-year-olds. European Journal of Developmental Psychology, 10(2), 106–127.
- Narvaez, D.; Gleason, T.; Wang, L.; Brooks, J.; Lefever, J. B.; Cheng, Y. (2013). "The evolved development niche: Longitudinal effects of caregiving practices on early childhood psychosocial development". Early Childhood Research Quarterly. 28 (4). Elsevier BV: 759–773. doi:10.1016/j.ecresq.2013.07.003. ISSN 0885-2006.
- Narvaez, D. (2016). Baselines for virtue. In J. Annas, D. Narvaez, & N. Snow (Eds.), Developing virtue: Integrating perspectives (pp. 14–33). . New York, NY: Oxford University Press.
- Four Arrows, & Narvaez, D. (2016). Reclaiming our indigenous worldview: A more authentic baseline for social/ecological justice work in education. In N. McCrary & W. Ross (Eds.), Working for social justice inside and outside the classroom: A community of teachers, researchers, and activists (pp. 93–112). In series, Social justice across contexts in education (S.J. Miller & L.D. Burns, Eds.). New York, NY: Peter Lang.
- Narvaez, D.; Wang, L.; Cheng, Y. (14 January 2016). "The evolved developmental niche in childhood: Relation to adult psychopathology and morality". Applied Developmental Science. 20 (4). Informa UK Limited: 294–309. doi:10.1080/10888691.2015.1128835. ISSN 1088-8691. S2CID 147625243.
- Christen, M.; Narvaez, D.; Gutzwiller-Helfenfinger, E. (25 November 2016). "Comparing and Integrating Biological and Cultural Moral Progress". Ethical Theory and Moral Practice. 20 (1). Springer Science and Business Media LLC: 55–73. doi:10.1007/s10677-016-9773-y. ISSN 1386-2820. S2CID 254461479.
- Narvaez, D. (2017). Getting back on track to being human. Interdisciplinary Journal of Partnership Studies, 4(1), March 2, 2017 Online publication available at: http://pubs.lib.umn.edu/ijps/vol4/iss1/5
- Narvaez, D. (2017). Are we losing it? Darwin's moral sense and the importance of early experience. In. R. Joyce (Ed.), Routledge Handbook of Evolution and Philosophy (pp. 322–332). London: Routledge.
- Witherington, D. C.; Overton, W. F.; Lickliter, R.; Marshall, P. J.; Narvaez, D. (2018). "Metatheory and the Primacy of Conceptual Analysis in Developmental Science". Human Development. 61 (3). S. Karger AG: 181–198. doi:10.1159/000490160. ISSN 0018-716X. S2CID 149666388.
- Reilly, T., & Narvaez, D. (2018). Character, virtue and science: Linking psychological and philosophical views. Philosophy, Theology and the Sciences, 5, 51–79.
- Kurth, A., & Narvaez, D. (2018). Children's developing morality. In J. Delafield-Butt, A-W. Dunlop & C. Trevarthen (Eds.), The Child's Curriculum: Working with the natural values of young children (pp. 104–125). Oxford: Oxford University Press.
- Narvaez, D. (2018). The developmental niche for peace. In P. Verbeek & B. Peters (Eds.), Peace ethology, behavioral processes and systems of peace (pp. 95–112). Oxford, England: Wiley-Blackwell.
- Narvaez, D. (2018). Ethogenesis: Evolution, early experience and moral becoming. In J. Graham & K. Gray (Eds.), The Atlas of Moral Psychology (pp. 451–464). New York: Guilford Press.
- Narvaez, D. (2018). "Social Development". In Shackelford, T.; Weekes-Shackleford, V. (eds.). Encyclopedia of Evolutionary Psychological Science. New York: Springer International Publishing. pp. 1–9. doi:10.1007/978-3-319-16999-6_2394-1. ISBN 978-3-319-16999-6.
- Stotz, K.; Narvaez, D. (2018). "Niche". In Zeigler-Hill, V.; Shackelford, T. (eds.). Encyclopedia of Personality and Individual Differences. New York: Springer International Publishing. pp. 1–4. doi:10.1007/978-3-319-28099-8_1554-1. ISBN 978-3-319-28099-8.
- Narvaez, D.; Witherington, D. (13 December 2018). "Getting to baselines for human nature, development, and wellbeing". Archives of Scientific Psychology. 6 (1). American Psychological Association: 205–213. doi:10.1037/arc0000053. ISSN 2169-3269.
- Narvaez, D.; Wang, L.; Cheng, A.; Gleason, T. R.; Woodbury, Ryan; Kurth, Angela; Lefever, Jennifer Burke (2 August 2019). "The importance of early life touch for psychosocial and moral development". Psicologia: Reflexão e Crítica. 32 (1). Springer Science and Business Media LLC: 16. doi:10.1186/s41155-019-0129-0. ISSN 1678-7153. PMC 6967013. PMID 32025990.
- Tarsha, M. S.; Narvaez, D. (2 January 2019). "Early Life Experience and Aggression". Peace Review. 31 (1). Informa UK Limited: 14–23. doi:10.1080/10402659.2019.1613591. ISSN 1040-2659. S2CID 198784235.
- Narvaez, D.; Woodbury, R.; Cheng, Y.; Wang, L.; Kurth, A.; Gleason, T.; Deng, L.; Gutzwiller-Helfenfinger, E.; Christen, M.; Näpflin, C. (2019). "Evolved Developmental Niche Provision Report: Moral Socialization, Social Thriving, and Social Maladaptation in Three Countries". SAGE Open. 9 (2). SAGE Publications: 215824401984012. doi:10.1177/2158244019840123. ISSN 2158-2440.
- Narvaez, D.; Snow, N. E. (2 January 2019). "Introduction to self, motivation and virtue studies". Journal of Moral Education. 48 (1). Informa UK Limited: 1–6. doi:10.1080/03057240.2019.1556939. ISSN 0305-7240.
- Reilly, T., & Narvaez, D. (2019). Virtue and the scientific researcher: Morality, wisdom and climate. In C. Deane-Drummond, T. Stapleford & D. Narvaez (Eds.), Practicing science: Virtues, values, and the good life. Pressbooks. Available at https://virtueandthepracticeofscience.pressbooks.com/
- Narvaez, D. (2019). Reclaiming awe for the right things. In C. Deane-Drummond, T. Stapleford, & D. Narvaez (Eds.), Practicing science: Virtues, values, and the good life (pp. 142–149). Notre Dame, IN: Center for Theology, Science and Human Flourishing. Available at https://virtueandthepracticeofscience.pressbooks.com/
- Narvaez, D. (2019). Moral development and moral values: Evolutionary and neurobiological influences. I. In D. P. McAdams, R. L. Shiner, & J. L. Tackett (Eds.), Handbook of personality (pp. 345–363). New York, NY: Guilford.
- Narvaez, D. (2019). In search of baselines: Why psychology needs cognitive archaeology. In T. Henley, M. Rossano & E. Kardas (Eds.), Handbook of Cognitive Archaeology: A Psychological Framework. London: Routledge.
- Narvaez, D. (2019). Evolution, childhood and the moral self. In R. Gipps & M. Lacewing (Eds.), The Oxford handbook of philosophy and psychoanalysis (pp. 637–659). London: Oxford University Press.
- Gleason, T. R.; Narvaez, D. (25 September 2019). "Beyond resilience to thriving: Optimizing child wellbeing". International Journal of Wellbeing. 9 (4): 59–78. doi:10.5502/ijw.v9i4.987. ISSN 1179-8602.
- Tarsha, M.; Narvaez, D. (22 November 2019). "The Evolved Nest: A Partnership System that Fosters Child and Societal Wellbeing". Interdisciplinary Journal of Partnership Studies. 6 (3). University of Minnesota: 1. doi:10.24926/ijps.v6i3.2244. ISSN 2380-8969.
- Narvaez, D. (2020). Ecocentrism: Resetting baselines for virtue development. Ethical Theory and Moral Practice. https://rdcu.be/b5xLu
- Narvaez, D. (21 July 2020). "Moral education in a time of human ecological devastation". Journal of Moral Education. 50 (1). Informa UK Limited: 55–67. doi:10.1080/03057240.2020.1781067. ISSN 0305-7240. S2CID 225570555.
- Kurth, A. M.; Narvaez, D.; Kohn, R.; Bae, A. (1 June 2020). "Indigenous Nature Connection: A 3-Week Intervention Increased Ecological Attachment". Ecopsychology. 12 (2). Mary Ann Liebert Inc: 101–117. doi:10.1089/eco.2019.0038. ISSN 1942-9347.
- Narvaez, D.; Duckett, L. (9 December 2019). "Ethics in Early Life Care and Lactation Practice". Journal of Human Lactation. 36 (1). SAGE Publications: 9–18. doi:10.1177/0890334419888454. ISSN 0890-3344. PMID 31815587.
- Narvaez, D.; Gleason, T.; Tarsha, M.; Woodbury, R.; Cheng, Y.; Wang, L. (8 November 2021). "Sociomoral Temperament: A Mediator Between Wellbeing and Social Outcomes in Young Children". Frontiers in Psychology. 12 742199. Frontiers Media SA. doi:10.3389/fpsyg.2021.742199. ISSN 1664-1078. PMC 8606405. PMID 34819896.
- Tarsha, M. S.; Narvaez, D. (22 October 2021). "Effects of adverse childhood experience on physiological regulation are moderated by evolved developmental niche history". Anxiety, Stress, & Coping. 35 (4). Informa UK Limited: 488–500. doi:10.1080/10615806.2021.1989419. ISSN 1061-5806. PMID 34676784. S2CID 239456064.
- Narvaez, D.; Moore, D. S.; Witherington, D. C.; Vandiver, T. I.; Lickliter, R. (2022). "Evolving evolutionary psychology". American Psychologist. 77 (3). American Psychological Association (APA): 424–438. doi:10.1037/amp0000849. ISSN 1935-990X. PMID 34780243. S2CID 244132848.

Gleason, T. R.; Tarsha, M. S.; Kurth, A. M.; Narvaez, D. (2021). "Opportunities for free play and young children's autonomic regulation". Developmental Psychobiology. 63 (6) e22134. Wiley. doi:10.1002/dev.22134. ISSN 0012-1630. PMID 34196394. S2CID 235696832.

=== Podcasts (sample) ===
- Hopper, D. (Producer). (2015, October 27). Academic Minute: Companionship Care. [Audio podcast]. Retrieved from: https://www.insidehighered.com
- Reagan, L. (Producer). (2016, January 9). Creating Sustainable Humans With Conscious Parenting: An Interview (at Kindred Media) [Audio podcast]. Retrieved from: http://kindredmedia.org/
- Listings
- Mason, Christine Marie. "Evolutionary Wisdom:Neuroscience for Flourishing Children". Rose Woman Podcast.

=== Films ===
- Breaking the Cycle
- The Evolved Nest: Nature's Way of Raising Children
- Reimagining Humanity
