= Marian Radke-Yarrow =

American psychologist

Marian Radke-Yarrow (March 2, 1918 – May 19, 2007) was an American developmental psychologist known for studying topics such as prejudice, altruism, and depression in children. She worked in academia in the early years after completing graduate school, and then she became a National Institute of Mental Health (NIMH) researcher who observed child behavior and parent-child interactions.

== Early life ==
Born in Horicon, Wisconsin, Radke-Yarrow had one sister, nine years older than herself. Her father worked in middle management for the company that became John Deere. Radke-Yarrow later recalled that she attended a year of preschool before beginning kindergarten. She said that although this was unusual for the era, it was the norm in her community.

Her father, Louis "Curly" Radke, was known for his involvement in the Izaak Walton League and in protecting the Horicon Marsh.

Radke-Yarrow completed undergraduate work in 1939 at University of Wisconsin–Madison, where her professors included Harry Harlow. A faculty member named Hulsey Cason encouraged her to go to graduate school and helped her to identify child development as a specialization. She then earned a doctorate in psychology from the University of Minnesota in 1944. She taught at Massachusetts Institute of Technology, Queens College and the University of Denver early in her career. The University of Minnesota later awarded her an "Outstanding Achievement Award" in 1982.

== Research career ==
Her 1952 book, They Learn What They Live: Prejudice in Young Children, which she co-wrote with Helen G. Trager, was cited in the Brown v. Board of Education desegregation case. As part of the Philadelphia Early Childhood Project, Radke-Yarrow and Trager interviewed 250 Philadelphia public school students between the ages of five and eight, and they looked at concepts like self-hatred as root causes of anti-Semitism and racism. She became one of few women who headed a laboratory at NIH, leading the developmental psychology laboratory at the NIMH from 1974 to 1995.

Radke-Yarrow had one of the most unique laboratories among NIMH researchers: she observed children and their parents in an old stone home known as The Wilson House. She spent many years studying the effects of maternal depression on children. She wrote about psychological resilience, discovering that some children of depressed mothers, especially boys, were not influenced as significantly by maternal mood disorders. She found that mothers with bipolar disorder tended to have children who thrived in elementary school; later, she discovered that this advantage disappeared by adolescence.

She was also one of the first Americans to go to the People's Republic of China. She went as part of a delegation of social scientists and she was able to make among the first observations on child rearing in the country. The delegation's book, Childhood in China, highlights her work there. She also served one term as president of the Division of Developmental Psychology at the American Psychological Association (APA). She received the APA's G. Stanley Hall Award.

== Later life ==
She died of leukemia at her home in Bethesda, Maryland, aged 89. She was predeceased by her husband, psychologist Leon Yarrow, in 1982. They had one son.
