= Happy victimizing =

Happy victimizing phenomenon, happy victimization phenomenon or happy victimizer phenomenon is a phenomenon in child development, particularly moral development and cognitive development. It amounts to an apparent disparity in moral conceptions of children under the age 6-7: while they understand that acts of victimization are wrong, they attribute exclusively positively valenced or "happy" emotions to victimizers, who achieve their goals while harming others. While the belief that "getting what one wants" is good regardless the cost may be attributed to people of any age, the happy victimizer phenomenon appears to contradict a number of mainstream theories according to which the awareness of victims' harm is supposed to give rise to certain negative emotions, such as remorse or fear of punishment.

Bryan Sokol points out that the earliest demonstration in which young children ascribed wrongdoers positive emotions was provided in 1980 by Barden, Zelko, Duncan, and Masters. In their test, they provided 40 hypothetical situations and asked subjects to predict one of the selected affective reactions ("happy", "scared", "sad", etc.) They singled out an observation that the situation "dishonesty (not caught)" was predicted by the youngest children to produce the "happy" emotion, while in the oldest group the consensus was for "fear". A more detailed report, frequently cited as pioneering, was that of Nunner-Winkler and Sodian (1988). In an effort to clarify the nature of young children's morality, they conducted a certain experiment and reported that most 4-year-olds attributed positive moral emotions to the wrongdoer focusing on the successful outcome of the wrongdoer's action, while 8-year-olds focused on the moral value of the wrongdoer's action and therefore attributed him negative feelings.
