= Moral development =

Emergence, change, and understanding of morality from infancy through adulthood

Moral development focuses on the emergence, change, and understanding of morality from infancy through adulthood. The theory states that morality develops across the lifespan in a variety of ways. Morality is influenced by an individual's experiences, behavior, and when they are faced with moral issues through different periods of physical and cognitive development. Morality concerns an individual's reforming sense of what is right and wrong; it is for this reason that young children have different moral judgment and character than that of a grown adult. Morality in itself is often a synonym for "rightness" or "goodness." It also refers to a specific code of conduct that is derived from one's culture, religion, or personal philosophy that guides one's actions, behaviors, and thoughts.

Some of the earliest known moral development theories came from philosophers like Confucius, Aristotle and Rousseau, who took a more humanist perspective and focused on the development of a sense of conscience and virtue. In the modern-day, empirical research has explored morality through a moral psychology lens by theorists like Sigmund Freud and its relation to cognitive development by theorists like Jean Piaget, Lawrence Kohlberg, B. F. Skinner, Carol Gilligan, and Judith Smetana.

Moral development often emphasizes these four fundamentals:

1. Feeling or emotion aspect: these theories emphasize the affective aspect of moral development and include several altruism theories.
2. Behavioural aspect: these theories mainly deal with moral behaviour.
3. Cognitive aspect: these theories focus on moral judgment and moral reasoning.
4. Integrated perspectives: several theorists have also attempted to propose theories which integrate two or three of the affective, behavioural, and cognitive aspects of morality.

== Background ==
Morality refers to “the ability to distinguish right from wrong, to act on this distinction and to experience pride when we do the right things and guilt or shame when we do not.” Both Piaget and Kohlberg made significant contributions to this area of study. Experts in developmental psychology have categorized morality into three key facets: the emotional aspect, the cognitive aspect, and the action-oriented aspect.

- The emotional aspect encapsulates the feelings accompanying decisions that may be considered morally right or wrong, like guilt or empathy.
- The cognitive aspect delves into the mental mechanisms people employ to judge whether actions are morally acceptable or not. For instance, a child aged eight might be told by a trusted adult not to eat cookies from a jar, yet the temptation to disobey may arise when they're alone. However, this urge is weighed against their understanding that they could face repercussions for doing so.
- The action-oriented aspect concerns how individuals conduct themselves in situations tempting dishonesty or when they are presented with the opportunity to aid someone in need.

=== Moral affect ===
Moral affect is “emotion related to matters of right and wrong”. Such emotion includes shame, guilt, embarrassment, and pride; shame is correlated with the disapproval by one's peers, guilt is correlated with the disapproval of oneself, embarrassment is feeling disgraced while in the public eye, and pride is a feeling generally brought about by a positive opinion of oneself when admired by one's peers.

Empathy is also tied in with moral affect and is an emotional unfolding that allows you to be able to understand how another person feels. If an empathetic person sees someone crying, then they may understand their sadness. If the empathetic person sees someone that has just accomplished a lifelong goal, they may understand their happiness. Empathy falls under the affective component of morality and is the main reasoning behind selflessness. According to theorist Martin Hoffman, empathy plays a key role in the progression of morality. Empathy causes people to be more prominent in prosocial behavior as discussed earlier. Without empathy, there would be no humanity.

=== Moral reasoning ===
Moral reasoning is the thinking process involved in deciding whether an act is right or wrong. This allows the development of social cognition, which is required for experiencing other people's distress. These skills also enable the construction of a concept of reciprocity and fairness, allowing people to go beyond mere egocentrism. According to Piaget and Kohlberg, moral reasoning progresses through a constant sequence, a fixed and universal order of stages, each of which contains a consistent way of thinking about moral issues that are all distinct from one another.

=== Social Learning Theory ===
Based on the observing of others and modelling behaviours, emotions and attitudes of others. This theory is derived from the concept of perspective behaviourism but has elements of cognitive learning as well. The theory says that people especially children learn from observing others and the environment around them. It also says that imitation modelling has a major role in the learning and development of the person and their beliefs or morals. Albert Bandura was a major contributor to the theory of social learning and made many contributions to the field with social experiments and research. The social learning theory says that children learn and develop morals from observing what is around them and having role models that they imitate the behaviour and learn. Role models guide children in indirectly developing morals and morality. By watching the responses of others and society around them, children learn what is acceptable and what is not acceptable and try to act similarly to what is deemed acceptable by the society around them.

For example, a child's older sibling tends to serve as one of their first role models, especially because they share the same surroundings and authority figures. When the older child misbehaves or does something unacceptable the younger child takes the older one as an example and acts like him or her. However, if the parent punishes the older child or there is a consequence to their behavior, the younger child often does not act like the older one because they were able to observe that that behavior was “unacceptable” by the “society” surrounding them, meaning their family. This example coincides with the fact that children know that stealing, killing, and lying is bad, and honesty, kindness, and being polite is good.

=== Evolutionary Theory ===
The Evolutionary Theory of Morality tries to explain morality and its development in terms of evolution and how it may at first seem contradictory for humans to have morals and morality in the evolutionary opinion. Evolution has many beliefs and parts to it but as most commonly seen, it is the survival of the fittest. This behavior is driven from the desire to pass on your genes. Whether that means being selfish or caring for your young just to make sure that your genes survive. That may seem to conflict with morality and having morals, however e argue that that may be related and having morality and morals might actually be a factor that contributes to the theory of evolution. Additionally, humans have developed communities and a social lifestyle which makes it necessary to develop morals. In an evolutionary view, a human being that acts immorally will suffer consequences, such as paying a fine, going to prison, or being an outcast. Whatever it is, there is a loss to that human. Therefore, that individual eventually learns that to be accepted in society, it is necessary to develop morals and act on them.

== Historical background and foundational theories ==
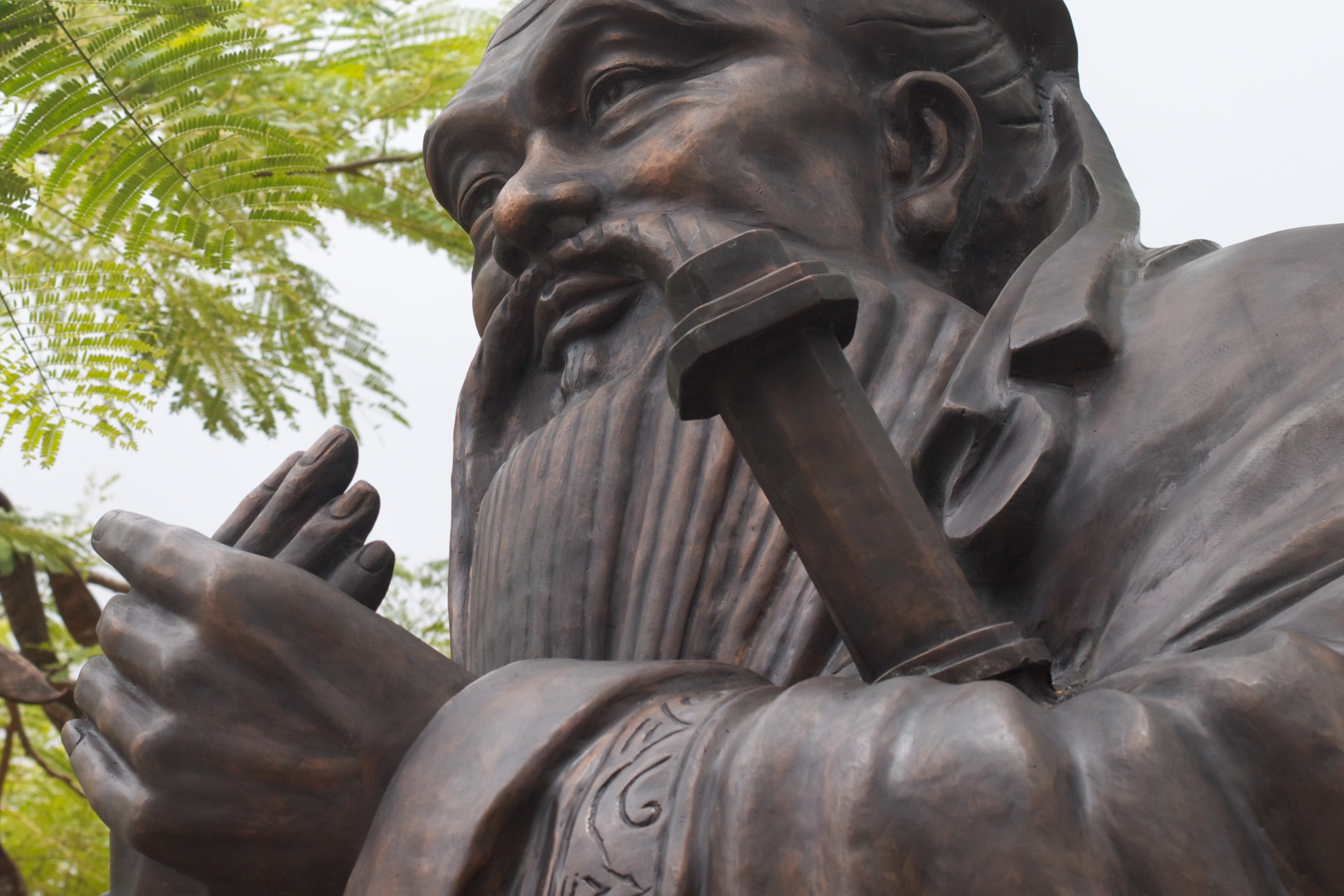
Confucius

=== Freud: Morality and the Superego ===
Sigmund Freud, a prominent psychologist who is best known as the founder of psychoanalysis, proposed the existence of a tension between the needs of society and the individual. According to Freud's theory, moral development occurs when an individual's selfish desires are repressed and replaced by the values of critical socializing agents in one's life (for instance, one's parents). In Freud's theory, this process involves the improvement of the ego in balancing the needs and tensions between the id (selfish desires and impulses) and the super-ego (one's internal sense of cultural needs and norms).

=== B.F. Skinner's Behavioral Theory ===
A proponent of behaviorism, B.F. Skinner similarly focused on socialization as the primary force behind moral development. In contrast to Freud's notion of a struggle between internal and external forces, Skinner focused on the power of external forces (reinforcement contingencies) in shaping an individual's development. Behaviorism is founded on the belief that people learn from the consequences of their behavior. He called his theory "operant conditioning" when a specific stimulus is reinforced for one to act. Essentially, Skinner believed that all morals were learned behaviors based on the punishments and rewards (either explicit or implicit) that the person had experienced during their life, in the form of trial-and-error behavioral patterns.

=== Piaget's Theory of Moral Development ===
Jean Piaget was the first psychologist to suggest a theory of moral development. According to Piaget, development only emerges with action, and a person constructs and reconstructs his knowledge of the world as the result of new interactions with his environment. Piaget said that people pass through three different stages of moral reasoning: premoral period, heteronomous morality, and autonomous morality.

During the premoral stage (occurring during the preschool years), children show very little awareness or understanding of rules and cannot be considered moral beings. The heteronomous stage (occurring between the ages of 6 and 10) is defined as "under the rule of another": during this stage, the child takes rules more seriously, believing that they are handed down by authority figures and are sacred and never to be altered; regardless of whether the intentions were good or bad, any violator to these passed-down rules will be judged as wrongdoing. In the last stage, autonomous morality (occurring between the ages of 10 and 11), children begin to appreciate that rules are agreements between individuals.

While both Freud and Skinner focused on the external forces that bear on morality (parents in the case of Freud, and behavioral contingencies in the case of Skinner), Jean Piaget (1965) focused on the individual's construction, construal, and interpretation of morality from a socio-cognitive and socio-emotional perspective. As the first to suggest such a theory on moral development, Piaget strove to understand adult morality through the morality of a child and the factors that contribute to the emergence of central moral concepts such as welfare, justice, and rights. In interviewing children using the Clinical Interview Method, Piaget (1965) found that young children were focused on authority mandates and that with age, children become autonomous, evaluating actions from a set of independent principles of morality. Piaget characterizes children's morality development through observing children while playing games to see if rules are followed. He took these observations and organized three stages of development that people pass through within childhood, these stages being; premoral period, heteronomous morality, and autonomous morality. The premoral stage is the earliest of the three, starting in the earliest years of a child’s life, the time they enter preschool. It is characterized by the children’s general ignorance of morals or rules in general, as it is called the “premoral” stage. During the elementary school years children enter the heteronomous morality stage. This is the stage where children are trusting those who are older than them and the knowledge of the world they have. Any rules they receive are perfect and need to be followed unconditionally. Lastly, in the autonomous morality stage, children become more knowledgeable about how rules really work and what they are. They can then start to choose to follow them or to disobey autonomously.

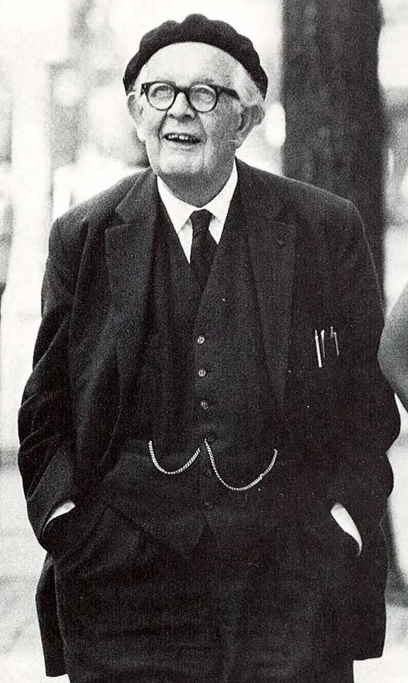
Jean Piaget.

=== Kohlberg: Moral Reasoning ===
Influenced by Piaget's work, Kohlberg created an influential cognitive development theory of moral development. Like Piaget, Kohlberg formulated that moral growth occurs in a very universal and consistent sequence of three moral levels, but for him the stages in the sequence are connected with one another, and grows out of the preceding stage. Kohlberg's view represents a more complex way of thinking about moral issues.

Lawrence Kohlberg proposed a highly influential theory of moral development which was inspired by the works of Jean Piaget and John Dewey. Unlike the previously mentioned psychologists, Kohlberg viewed these stages in a more continual way. Rather than having completely separate stages, he proposed that the following steps were interconnected in that each will lead to the other as the person grows. Kohlberg was able to demonstrate through research that humans improved their moral reasoning in 6 specific steps. These stages, which fall into categories of pre-conventional (punishment avoidance and self-interest), conventional (social norms and authority figures), and post-conventional (universal principles), progress from childhood and throughout adult life. In his research, Kohlberg was more interested in the reasoning behind a person’s answer to a moral dilemma than the given answer itself.

==== Judgement-Action Gap ====
Over forty years, the biggest dilemma that has arisen regarding moral theory is the judgment-action gap. This is also known as the competence performance gap, or the moral-action gap. Kohlberg's theory focused on the stages of moral reasoning by basing it on the competence of an individual working through a moral dilemma. The reason this gap form is due to an error in hypotheticals. When creating a hypothetical dilemma, individuals neglect to include the contingencies of real life constraints. The opposite occurs when an individual is applying their reasoning to a real-life moral dilemma. In this situation instead of leaving out the constraints during their thought process one will include every constraint. Due to this occurrence, a gap forms as a result of creating a position and defending it in a rational manner in response to a situation that requires moral action.

==== Stages of moral reasoning ====
The first level of Kohlberg's moral reasoning is called preconventional morality. In this stage, children obey rules more externally. This means the children are more likely to conform to rules authority sets for them, to avoid punishment or to receive personal rewards. There are two stages within preconventional morality. The first is punishment and obedience orientation. During this stage, the child determines how wrong their action was according to the punishment they receive. If they do not get scolded for their bad act, they will believe they did nothing wrong. The second stage of preconventional morality is called instrumental hedonism. The main principle for this stage is quid pro quo. A person in the second stage conforms to rules for personal gain. There is a hint of understanding the ruler's perspective, although the main objective is to gain the benefit in return.

The next level is conventional morality. At this level, many moral values have been internalized by the individual. they work to obey rules set by authority and to seek approval. The points of views of others are now clearly recognized and taken into serious consideration. The first stage to this level is labeled “good boy” or “good girl” morality. The following stage captures the golden rule “treat others the way you want to be treated.” The emphasis in this stage consists of being nice and meaning well. What is seen as “good” is now what pleases and helps others. The last stage of this level is “Authority and social order-maintaining morality.” This is conforming to set rules created by legitimate authorities that benefits society as a whole. The basis of reciprocation is growing more complex. The purpose of conforming is no longer based on the fear of punishment, but on the value people place on respecting the law and doing one's duty to society.

The final level of moral reasoning is postconventional morality. The individual determines what the moral ideal for society is. The individual will begin to distinguish between what is morally acceptable and what is legal. They will recognize some laws violate basic moral principles. They will go beyond perspectives of social groups or authorities and will start to accept the perspectives of all points of view around the world. In the first stage of postconventional, called “morality of contract, individual rights and democratic accepted law”, all people willingly work towards benefitting everyone. They understand all social groups within a society have different values but believe all intellectuals would agree on two points. First, freedom of liberty and life. Second, agreement to having a democratic vote for changing unfair laws and improving their society. The final stage of the final level of Kohlberg's moral reasoning is “morality of individual principles of conscience”, At this highest stage of moral reasoning, Kohlberg defines his stage 6 subjects as having a clear and broad concept of universal principles. The stage 6 thinker does not create the basis for morality. Instead, they explore, through self-evaluation, complex principles of respect for all individuals and for their rights that all religions or moral authorities would view as moral. Kohlberg stopped using stage 6 in his scoring manual, saying it was a “theoretical stage”. He began to score postconventional responses only up to stage 5.

=== Social Domain Theory ===
Elliot Turiel argued for a social domain approach to social cognition, delineating how individuals differentiate moral (fairness, equality, justice), societal (conventions, group functioning, traditions), and psychological (personal, individual prerogative) concepts from early in development throughout the lifespan. Over the past 40 years, research findings have supported this model, demonstrating how children, adolescents, and adults differentiate moral rules from conventional rules, identify the personal domain as a non regulated domain, and evaluate multifaceted (or complex) situations that involve more than one domain. This research has been conducted in a wide range of countries (Argentina, Australia, Brazil, Canada, China, Colombia, Germany, Hong Kong, India, Italy, Japan, Korea, Nigeria, Spain, Switzerland, Turkey, U.K., U.S., Virgin Islands) and with rural and urban children, for low and high income communities, and traditional and modern cultures. Turiel's social domain theory showed that children were actually younger in developing moral standards than past psychologists predicted.

=== Contemporary developments ===
For the past 20 years, researchers have expanded the field of moral development, applying moral judgment, reasoning, and emotion attribution to topics such as prejudice, aggression, theory of mind, emotions, empathy, peer relationships, and parent-child interactions. The Handbook of Moral Development (2006), edited by Melanie Killen and Judith Smetana, provides a wide range of information about these topics covered in moral development today. One of the main objectives was to provide a sense of the current state of the field of moral development.

== Cognition and intentionality ==
A hallmark of moral understanding is intentionality, which can be defined as "an attribution of the target's intentions towards another," or a sense of purpose or directedness towards a certain result. According to researchers Malle, Moses, and Baldwin (2001), five components make up people's concept of intentionality: an action is considered intentional if a personal has (a) a desire for an outcome, (b) a belief that the action will lead to the outcome, (c) an intention to perform the action, (d) skill to perform the action, and (e) awareness while performing it.

Recent research on children's theory of mind (ToM) has focused on when children understand others' intentions The moral concept of one's intentionality develops with experience in the world. Yuill (1984) presented evidence that comprehension of one's intentions plays a role in moral judgment, even in young children. Killen, Mulvey, Richardson, Jampol, and Woodward (2011) present evidence that with developing false belief competence (ToM), children are capable of using information about one's intentions when making moral judgments about the acceptability of acts and punishments, recognizing that accidental transgressors, who do not hold hostile intentions, should not be held accountable for adverse outcomes.

In this study, children who lacked false belief competence were more likely to attribute blame to an accidental transgressor than children with demonstrated false belief competence. In addition to evidence from a social cognitive perspective, behavioral evidence suggests that even three-year-olds can take into account a person's intention and apply this information when responding to situations. Vaish, Carpenter, and Tomasello (2010), for instance, presented evidence that three-year-olds are more willing to help a neutral or helpful person than a harmful person. Beyond identifying one's intentionality, mental state understanding plays a crucial role in identifying victimization. While obvious distress cues (e.g., crying) allow even three-year-olds to identify victims of harm, it is not until around six years of age that children can appreciate that a person may be an unwilling victim of harm even in the absence of obvious distress. In their study, Shaw and Wainryb (2006) discovered that children older than six interpret compliance, resistance, and subversion to illegitimate requests (e.g., clean my locker) from a victim's perspective. That is, they judge that victims who resist illegitimate requests will feel better than victims who comply.

== Emotions ==
Moral questions tend to be emotionally charged issues that evoke strong affective responses. Consequently, emotions likely play an important role in moral development. However, there is currently little consensus among theorists on how emotions influence moral development. Psychoanalytic theory, founded by Freud, emphasizes the role of guilt in repressing primal drives. Research on prosocial behavior has focused on how emotions motivate individuals to engage in moral or altruistic acts. Social-cognitive development theories have recently begun to examine how emotions influence moral judgments. Intuitionist theorists assert that moral judgments can be reduced to immediate, instinctive emotional responses elicited by moral dilemmas.

Research on socioemotional development and prosocial development has identified several "moral emotions" which are believed to motivate moral behavior and influence moral development. These moral emotions are said to be linked to moral development because they are evidence and reflective of an individual's set of moral values, which must have undergone through the process of internalization in the first place. The manifestation of these moral emotions can occur at two separate timings: either before or after the execution of a moral or immoral act. A moral emotion that precedes an action is referred to as an anticipatory emotion, and a moral emotion that follows an action is referred to as a powerful emotion. The primary emotions consistently linked with moral development are guilt, shame, empathy, and sympathy. Guilt has been defined as "an agitation-based emotion or painful feeling of regret that is aroused when the actor causes, anticipates causing, or is associated with an aversive event". Shame is often used synonymously with guilt, but implies a more passive and dejected response to a perceived wrong. Guilt and shame are considered "self-conscious" emotions because they are of primary importance to an individual's self-evaluation. Moreover, there exists a bigger difference between guilt and shame that goes beyond the type of feelings that they may provoke within an individual. This difference lies in the fact that these two moral emotions do not weigh the same in terms of their impact on moral behaviors. Studies on the effects of guilt and shame on moral behaviors have shown that guilt has a larger ability to dissuade an individual from making immoral choices, whereas shame did not seem to have any deterring effect on immoral behaviors. However, different types of behaviors in different types of populations, under different circumstances, might not generate the same outcomes. In contrast to guilt and shame, empathy and sympathy are considered other-oriented moral emotions. Empathy is commonly defined as an affective response produced by the apprehension or comprehension of another's emotional state, which mirrors the other's affective state. Similarly, sympathy is defined as an emotional response produced by the apprehension or comprehension of another's emotional state which does not mirror the other's effect but instead causes one to express concern or sorrow for the other.

The relation between moral action and moral emotions has been extensively researched. Very young children have been found to express feelings of care, and empathy towards others, showing concerns for others' well-being. Research has consistently demonstrated that when empathy is induced in an individual, he or she is more likely to engage in subsequent prosocial behavior. Additionally, other research has examined emotions of shame and guilt concerning children's empathic and prosocial behavior.

While emotions serve as information for children in their interpretations about moral consequences of acts, the role of emotions in children's moral judgments has only recently been investigated. Some approaches to studying emotions in moral judgments come from the perspective that emotions are automatic intuitions that define morality. Other approaches emphasize the role of emotions as evaluative feedback that help children interpret acts and consequences. Research has shown children attribute different emotional outcomes to actors involved in moral transgressions than those involved in conventional transgressions( Arsenio & Fleiss, 1996). Emotions may help individuals prioritize among different information and possibilities and reduce information processing demands in order to narrow the scope of the reasoning process (Lemerise & Arsenio, 2000). In addition, Malti, Gummerum, Keller, & Buchmann, (2009) found individual differences in how children attribute emotions to victims and victimizers.

== Throughout the lifespan ==
=== Infant ===
Infants, as they are newly entering the world, are not aware of morality or rules in general. This puts them at a stage of life where they are focusing on learning about the world around them through the people they are around. They are able to pick up on social connections and kindness, even if they are not explicitly aware of social cues or rules.

An infant is not held accountable for wrongdoings because an infant is considered to be amoral. Infants do not have the ability to understand morality at this stage of their life. Infancy ranges from birth to the age of two. It is during this time that infants learn how to be prosocial and empathetic by observing those around them.

==== Early moral training ====
An example of early moral training is given by Roger Burton. Roger Burton observed his 1-year-old daughter Ursula take her sister's Halloween candy. The older sister quickly scolded the infant for doing so. After a week had passed the infant went and stole candy again but was confronted by her mother this time. Yet again the infant stole her sister's candy, so Burton approached his daughter himself. As Burton was about to say something to Ursula, she spoke and said, “No this is Maria's, not Ursula's.” This specific example given by Burton shows how the infant grows and imputes morality slowly but surely. Over time infants start to understand that their behavior can cause repercussions. The infants learn by observing their surrounding environment. A 1-year-old may cease to commit a certain action because of feelings of apprehension due to past experiences of criticism. Both disapproval and reward are key factors in furthering the infants' development. If a baby is especially close to his mom, her disapproval and reward are that much more impactful in this process than it would be for a baby who was unattached to his mom. Infants are excellent at reading the emotions of others which in turn directs them in knowing what is good and what is bad. A strong attachment between parent and infant is the key to having success with the infants' socialization. If the relationship between the two is not stable by 15 months, at 4 the child will show animosity and troublesome behavior. At 5 the child is likely to show signs of destructive behavior. In order to ensure this does not happen, a mutually responsive orientation among the parent and offspring is necessary. Meaning, “A close emotionally positive and cooperative relationship in which child and care giver cares about each other and are sensitive to each other's needs.” With this bond, parents can help their child's conscience grow.

==== Empathy and Prosocial Behavior ====
Empathy and Prosocial Behavior: Unlike what Freud, Kohlberg, and Piaget said about infants being focused solely on themselves, Krebs's has a different take on the infant. Krebs's outlook on infants is that they can and do express signs of empathy and prosocial behavior. After being born, newborns show empathy in a primitive way by showing signs of agony when hearing other babies cry. Although it is not certain whether these babies can tell the difference between their own cry and another infants, Martin Hoffman explains that between the age of 1 and 2 infants are more able to perform real moral acts. Hoffman observed a 2-year-old's reaction to another child in distress. The 2-year-old offered his own teddy bear to his peer. This simple act shows that the 2-year-old was putting himself in the shoes of his peer Another study was done by Carolyn Zahn-Waxler and her team on this topic. Waxler found that over half of the infants involved took part in at least one act of prosocial behavior Hoffman feels that as children mature empathy in turn becomes less about oneself and more about cognitive development.

=== Childhood ===
One of the main contributors in the understanding of childhood morality, as mentioned above, was Kohlberg. While in these younger ages, children see rules as immovable forces that cannot not be changed. These tend to be implemented by those who they see as being in authority.

Kohlberg also said that moral development does not just stop or is complete at a certain time or stage but instead that it is continuous and happens throughout a person's lifetime. Kohlberg used stories that are known as Heinz dilemmas which are controversial stories to see what people felt was morally acceptable and what was not. From that he developed his theory with his six stages of moral development which are: obedience, self-interest, conformity, law and order, human rights, and universal human ethics.

==== Weighing Intentions ====
As mentioned before, Kohlberg believed that moral development was an ongoing thing and that through experiences it develops and adapts. Moreover, in children's moral thinking there comes a time when morality and moral decisions are made based on consequences, that is to say that they start weighing intentions in order to decide and learn whether something is morally okay or not.

An example of this can be seen in identifying the intentions of specific behaviors. We as a society also operate in that way because the same outcome or behavior can be considered acceptable had the intentions for it been good versus another time where the intentions were bad and in that case it would be unacceptable. In a situation where a child is trying to help their parent clean and misplaces something accidentally, it is easily forgiven and is considered morally acceptable because his/her intentions were good. However, if the child purposely hid the object so their parent would not find it, it is morally unacceptable because the intentions were bad. Ultimately, it is the same situation and same outcome but the intentions are different. At the age of 10–11 years children realize this concept and start justifying their actions and behaviors by weighing their intentions.

==== Understanding Rules ====
In Kohlberg's theory of moral development there are six definite stages. The first stage is called obedience and punishment orientation. And this stage is governed by the concept of having rules, laws, and things that one must follow. In children there is a set of rules set down by their authority figures, often being their parents. At this stage of moral development, morality is defined by these rules and laws that they think are set in stone and can never change. To a child, these rules are ones that can never be wrong and that define good and bad and show the difference between them. Later on however, these rules become more like guidelines and can change based on the situation they are presented in. Another aspect of these rules is the concept of punishment and reinforcement and that's how children realize what is considered morally okay or not.

An example of this is in the dilemmas used by Kohlberg, when he asked children to justify or judge the situation and their answer was always justified by something similar to “this is not fair” or “this is wrong because lying is bad” etc. This shows that at this particular stage children are not yet contributing members in terms of moral development.

==== Applying Theory of Mind ====
The theory of mind tells us that children need to develop a sense of self in order to develop morality and moral concepts. As the child develops, s/he needs to experience and observe in order to realize how they fit into society and eventually become part of it thereby establishing a sense of self-identity. This sense of self-identity depends on many things and it is important to develop and learn from those stages in order to fully develop understand good from bad.

==== Moral Socialization ====
Moral socialization talks about how morality is passed on. This perspective says that adults or parents pass down and teach their children the acceptable behavior through techniques and teaching as well as punishments and reinforcements. This then shows that children who learn and develop morality have good listening and are more compliant and it is because of that that they are morally developed. Therefore, if a parent fails to teach that to their child, the child then would not develop morality. Moral socialization also has studies that show that parents who use techniques that are not violent or aggressive and unconditional raise children with more conscience. Therefore, these children have more of a sense of morality and are more morally developed.

=== Adolescence ===
As an individual matures, they move from a strict and clear moral understanding that is based on those they view as having authority to being able to think for themselves and learning about what they think themselves. They are in the stage of life where they are gaining more independence from their parents and figuring out who they are, and in doing so, this can cause initial confusion when it comes to such topics like morality.

==== Changes in moral reasoning ====
The teen years are a significant period for moral growth. The moral reasoning percentage range displays that the preconventional reasoning (stage one and two) decrease rapidly as they reach teen years. During adolescence, conventional reasoning (stage three and four) become the centralized mode of moral thinking. Early year teens reflect stage 2 (instrumental hedonism) - “treat others how you would like to be treated”- or stage 3 (good boy or good girl) which involves earning approval and being polite. Almost half the percent of 16- to 18-year-olds display stage 3 reasoning and only a fifth were scored as stage 4 (authority and social order-maintaining morality) arguments. As adolescents start to age more they begin to take a broad societal perspective and act in ways to benefit the social system. The main developmental trend in moral reasoning occurs during the shift from preconventional to conventional reasoning. During the shift, individuals carry out moral standards that have been passed down by authority. Many teens characterize a moral person as caring fair, and honest. Adolescents who display these aspects tend to advance their moral reasoning.

==== Antisocial behavior ====
The adolescents who do not internalize society's moral standards, are more likely to be involved in antisocial conduct such as, muggings, rapes, armed robberies, etc. Most antisocial adults start their bad behavior in childhood and continue on into adolescence. Misbehavior seen in childhood increases, resulting in juvenile delinquency as adolescents. Actions such as leaving school early, having difficulty maintaining a job, and later participating in law-breaking as adults. Children who are involved in these risky activities are diagnosed as having conduct disorder and will later develop antisocial personality disorder. There are at least two outcomes of antisocial youths. First, a noticeable group of children who are involved in animal cruelty, and violence amongst their peers which then consistently progresses throughout their entire lifespan. The second group consists of the larger population of adolescents who misbehave primarily due to peer pressure but outgrow this behavior when they reach adulthood. Juveniles are most likely to depend on preconventional moral reasoning. Some offenders lack a well-developed sense of right and wrong. A majority of delinquents are able to reason conventionally but commit illegal acts anyway.

==== Dodge's social information processing model ====
Kenneth Dodge progressed on the understanding of aggressive/aggression behavior with creating his social information processing model. He believed that people's retaliation to frustration, anger or provocation do not depend so much on social cues in the situation as on the ways which they process and interpret this information. An individual who is provoked goes through a six step progress of processing information. According to dodge the individual will encode and interpret cues, then clarify goals. Following this, he will respond search and decision, thinking of possible actions to achieve goal to then weigh pros and cons of alternative options. Finally, he will perform behavioral enactment, or take action. People do not go through these steps in the exact order in all cases, they may take two and work on them simultaneously or repeat the steps. Also, an individual may come up with information from not only the current situation, but also from a previous similar social experience and work off of that. The six steps in social information processing advance as one ages.

==== Patterson's coercive family environments ====
Gerald Patterson observed that highly antisocial children and adolescents tend to be raised in coercive family environments in which family members try to control the others through negative, coercive tactics. The parental guidance in these households realize they are able to control their children temporarily with threatening them and providing negative reinforcement. The child also learns to use negative reinforcement to get what they want by ignoring, whining and throwing tantrums. Eventually, both sides (parents and children) lose all power of the situation and nothing is resolved. It becomes evident of how a child is raised on how they will become very hostile or present aggressiveness to resolve all their disputes. Patterson discusses how growing up in a coercive family environment creates an antisocial adolescent due to the fact they are already unpleasant to be around they begin to perform poorly in school and are rejected to all their peers. With no alternative option, they turn to the low-achieving, antisocial youths who encourage bad behavior. Dodge's theory is well supported by many cases of ineffective parenting contributing to the child's behavior problems, association with antisocial groups, resulting in antisocial behavior in adolescence.

==== Nature and nurture ====
The next theory that may contribute to antisocial behavior is between genetic predisposition and social learning experiences. Aggression is seen more in the evolutionary aspect. An example being, males are more aggressive than females and are involved in triple the amount of crime. Aggression has been present in males for centuries due to male dependence on dominance to compete for mates and pass genes to further generations. Most individuals are born with temperaments, impulsive tendencies, and other characteristics that relate to a delinquent. Although predisposed aspects have a great effect on the adolescent's behavior, if the child grows up in a dysfunctional family and receive poor parenting or is involved in an abusive environment that will increase the chances immensely for antisocial behaviors to appear.

==== Changes in Moral Reasoning ====
Lawrence Kohlberg has led most of the studies based on moral development in adults. In Kohlberg's studies, the subjects are ranked accordingly at one of the six stages. Stage 1 is called the Obedience and Punishment Orientation. Stage 1 is preconventional morality because the subject sees morality in an egocentric way. Stage 2 is also considered to be preconventional morality and is labeled as Individualism and Exchange. At this stage, the individual is still concentrated on the self and his surrounding environment. Stages 3 and 4 are at level 2, Conventional Morality. Stage 3 is called Interpersonal Relationships and is the point where the individual realizes that people should behave in good ways not only for the benefit of themselves but the family and community as well. Stage 4, Maintaining the Social Order, the individual is more concentrated on society as a whole. Stage 5 and 6 are both at level 3, post-conventional Morality. Stage 5 is the social contract and Individual Rights. At this stage people are contemplating what makes a good society rather than just what makes a society run smoothly. Stage 6, Universal Principles is the last stage which interprets the foundation of justice Kohlberg completed a 20-year study and found that most 30-year-old adults were at stage 3 and 4, the conventional level. According to this study there is still room for moral development in adulthood.

==== Kohlberg's Theory in Perspective ====
Kohlberg's theory of moral development greatly influenced the scientific body of knowledge. That being said, it is now being evaluated and researchers are looking for a more thorough explanation of moral development. Kohlberg stated that there is no variation to his stages of development. Despite this, modern research explains that children are more morally mature than Kohlberg had noted. On top of that, there is no strong evidence to suggest that people go from conventional to postconventional. Lastly, it is now known that Kohlberg's theory is biased against numerous people.

==== New Approaches to Morality ====
The main focus of developmentalists now is how important emotion is in terms of morality. Developmental researchers are examining the emotions of children and adults when exhibiting good and bad behavior. The importance of innate feelings and hunches in regards to morality are also being contemplated by doctors. Researchers have also come up with dual-process models of morality. This process examines Kohlberg's rational deliberation as well as the more recent study of innate feelings and emotions. Joshua Green is one scholar who backs the dual-process models of morality and feels that there are different situations that call for each view. All in all, there are many factors that come into play in deciding whether a person will behave in a certain fashion when dealing with a moral decision.

== Role of interpersonal, intergroup, and cultural influences ==
Children's interactions and experiences with caregivers and peers have been shown to influence their development of moral understanding and behavior Researchers have addressed the influence of interpersonal interactions on children's moral development from two primary perspectives: Socialization/Internalization) and social domain theory.

Research from the social domain theory perspective focuses on how children actively distinguish moral from conventional behavior based in part on the responses of parents, teachers, and peers. Social domain suggests that there are different areas of reasoning co-existing in development those include societal (concerns about conventions and grouping), moral (fairness, justice and rights) and psychological (concerns with personal goals and identity). Adults tend to respond to children's moral transgressions (e.g., hitting or stealing) by drawing the child's attention to the effect of his or her action on others, and doing so consistently across various contexts. In contrast, adults are more likely to respond to children's conventional misdeeds (e.g., wearing a hat in the classroom, eating spaghetti with fingers) by reminding children about specific rules and doing so only in certain contexts (e.g., at school but not at home). Peers respond mainly to moral but not conventional transgressions and demonstrate emotional distress (e.g., crying or yelling) when they are the victim of moral but unconventional transgressions.

Research from a socialization/internalization perspective focuses on how adults pass down standards or rules of behavior to children through parenting techniques and why children do or do not internalize those values. From this perspective, moral development involves children's increasing compliance with and internalization of adult rules, requests, and standards of behavior. Using these definitions, researchers find that parenting behaviors vary in the extent to which they encourage children's internalization of values and that these effects depend partially on a child's attributes, such as age and temperament. For instance, Kochanska (1997) showed that gentle parental discipline best promotes conscience development in temperamentally fearful children but that parental responsiveness and a mutually responsive parent-child orientation best promote conscience development in temperamentally fearless children. These parental influences exert their effects through multiple pathways, including increasing children's experience of moral emotions (e.g., guilt, empathy) and their self-identification as moral individuals. Development can be divided up to multiple stages however the first few years of development is usually seen to be formed by 5 years of age. According to Freud's research, relationships between a child and parents early on usually provides the basis for personality development as well as the formation of morality.

Researchers interested in intergroup attitudes and behavior related to one moral development have approached the study of stereotypes, prejudice, and discrimination in children and adolescents from several theoretical perspectives. Some, however not limited to are of these theoretical frameworks: Cognitive Development Theory; Social Domain Theory; Social Identity Development Theory Developmental Intergroup Theory Subjective Group Dynamics Implicit Theories and Intergroup-contact Theory. The plethora of research approaches is not surprising given the multitude of variables, (e.g., group identity, group status, group threat, group norms, intergroup contact, individual beliefs, and context) that need to be considered when assessing children's intergroup attitudes. While most of this research has investigated two-dimensional relationships between each of the three components: stereotypes, prejudice, and discrimination (e.g., the role of stereotypes in intergroup prejudice, use of stereotypes to reason about intergroup discrimination, how prejudices manifest into discrimination), very few have addressed all three aspects of intergroup attitudes and behaviors together.

In developmental intergroup research, stereotypes are defined as judgments made about an individual's attributes based on group membership. Stereotypes are more complex than regular judgments because they require one to recognize and understand which group an individual belongs to in order to be treated differently deliberately due to their group association. These groups may be defined by gender, race, religion, culture, nationality, and ethnicity. Social psychologists focus on stereotypes as a cognitive component influencing intergroup behaviors and tend to define them as being fixed concepts associated with a category. Prejudice, on the other hand, is defined in terms of negative attitudes or affective expressions toward a whole group or members of a group. Negative stereotypes and prejudices can manifest into discrimination towards an outgroup, and for children and adolescents, this may come in the form of exclusion from peer groups and the wider community (Killen & Rutland, 2011). Such actions can negatively impact a child in the long term in the sense of weakening one's confidence, self-esteem, and personal identity.

One explicit manner in which societies can socialize individuals is through moral education. Solomon and colleagues (1988) present evidence from a study that integrated direct instruction and guided reflection approaches to moral development, with evidence for resultant increases in spontaneous prosocial behavior.

Culture can also be a key contributor toward differences in morality within society. Prosocial behavior, which benefits others, is much more likely in societies with concrete social goals than societies that emphasize the individual. For example, children being raised in China eventually adopt the collective communist ideals of their society. Children learn to lie and deny responsibility for accomplishing something good instead of seeking recognition for their actions. Early indications of prosocial behavior include sharing toys and comforting distressed friends, and these characteristics can be seen in an individual's behavior as young as infancy and toddlerhood. Starting in preschool, sharing, helping, and other prosocial behaviors become more common, particularly in females, although the gender differences in prosocial behavior are not evident in all social contexts.

=== Moral relativism ===
Moral relativism, also called "cultural relativism," suggests that morality is relative to each culture. One cannot rightly pass moral judgment on members of other cultures except by their cultural standards when actions violate a moral principle, which may differ from one's own. Shweder, Mahapatra, and Miller (1987) argued for the notion that different cultures defined the boundaries of morality differently. The term is also different from moral subjectivism, which means that moral truth is relative to the individual. Moral relativism can be identified as a form of moral skepticism and is often misidentified as moral pluralism. It opposes the attitude of moral superiority and ethnocentrism found in moral absolutism and the views of moral universalism. Turiel and Perkins (2004) argued for the universality of morality, focusing mainly on evidence throughout the history of resistance movements that fight for justice by affirming individual self-determination rights. Miller (2006) proposes cultural variability in the priority given to moral considerations (e.g., the importance of prosocial helping). Rather than variability in what individuals consider moral (fairness, justice, rights). Wainryb (2006), in contrast, demonstrates that children in diverse cultures such as the U.S., India, China, Turkey, and Brazil share a pervasive view about upholding fairness and the wrongfulness of inflicting, among others. Cultures vary in conventions and customs, but not principles of fairness, which appear to emerge very early in development before socialization influences. Wainryb (1991; 1993) shows that many apparent cultural differences in moral judgments are due to different informational assumptions or beliefs about how the world works. When people hold different beliefs about the effects of actions or the status of different groups, their judgments about the harmfulness or fairness of behaviors often differ, even when they apply the same moral principles.

=== Religion ===
The role of religion in culture may influence a child's moral development and sense of moral identity. Values are transmitted through religion, which is for many inextricably linked to cultural identity. Religious development often goes along with the moral development of the children as it shapes the child's concepts of right and wrong. Intrinsic aspects of religion may have a positive impact on the internalization and the symbolism of moral identity. The child may internalize the parents' morals if a religion is a family activity or the religious social group's morals to which the child belongs. Religious development mirrors the cognitive and moral developmental stages of children. Nucci and Turiel (1993), on the other hand, proposed that the development of morality is distinct from the understanding of religious rules when assessing individuals' reactions to whether moral and nonmoral religious rules was contingent on God's word and whether a harmful act could be justified as morally correct based on God's commands. Children form their understanding of how they see the world, themselves, or others and can understand that not all religious rules are applied to morality, social structures, or different religions.

=== Moral development in Western and Eastern cultures ===
Morality is understood differently across cultures, and this has produced significant disagreement between researchers. According to Jia and Krettenauer, Western concepts of morality can often be considered universal by western researchers, however it is important to consider other viewpoints because such concepts are context-dependent; social expectations vary widely across the globe and even have different understandings of what constitutes as good or just.

Some researchers have theorized that a person’s moral motivations originate in their “moral identity,” or the extent to which they perceive themselves as moral individuals. However, other researchers believe that this view is limited because it does not account for more collectivistic cultures than individualistic in their societal values. Additionally, “concepts of justice, fairness, and harm to individuals” are emphasized as core elements of morality in Western cultures, whereas “concepts of interdependence, social harmony, and the role of cultural socialization” are emphasized as core elements of morality in Eastern cultures. Studies show that people in Taiwan focused on ethics of community, where people in the United States focused on ethics of autonomy.

Additionally, in an analysis on moral development in adolescents, Hart and Carlo mention that a study found that most (nearly ¾) American Adults held negative views of adolescents. This study mentions that the terms used by these adults “suggested moral shortcomings”, and that only 15% of the adults described adolescents positively. Additionally, the survey results show that the adults believe that adolescent’s biggest problem is the failure to learn and incorporate moral values in life. Although this perceived shortcoming and the implications on society are inaccurate, the perception has made research on moral development more common. Another study in the analysis suggests that those engaging in prosocial behavior as adults were more likely to have engaged in the same behaviors in adolescence. This analysis suggests that one notable aspect found in western cultures is the impact peers have on moral development in adolescence, compared to childhood. Additionally, adolescents tend to experience a lot of outside influence to their moral development compared to in childhood, when parental figures make up the majority of moral exemplars. However, adolescence and childhood lack a distinct separation in stages of moral development, rather adolescence is when moral skills learned in childhood fully develop and become more refined than previously seen.

=== Cross-cultural ethical principles ===
Some researchers have developed three categories for understanding ethical principles found cross-culturally: ethics of autonomy, ethics of community, and ethics of divinity. Ethics of autonomy (rights, freedom, justice), which are usually emphasized in individualistic/Western cultures, are centered on protecting and promoting individuals’ ability to make decisions based on their personal preferences. Ethics of community (duty, interdependence, and roles), which are usually more emphasized by collectivistic/Eastern cultures (and often corporations), aim to protect the integrity of a given group, such as a family or community. Ethics of divinity (natural order, tradition, purity) aim to protect a person's dignity, character, and spiritual aspects. These three dimensions of understanding form a research tool for studying moral development across cultures that can aid in determining possible universal traits in the lifespan of individuals.

=== Storytelling in Indigenous American communities ===
In Indigenous American communities, morality is often taught to children through storytelling. It can provide children with guidelines for understanding the core values of their community, the significance of life, and ideologies of moral character from past generations. Storytelling shapes the minds of young children in these communities and forms the dominant means for understanding and the essential foundation for learning and teaching.

Storytelling in everyday life is used as an indirect form of teaching. Stories embedded with lessons of morals, ideals, and ethics are told alongside daily household chores. Most children in Indigenous American communities develop a sense of keen attention to the details of a story to learn from them and understanding why people do the things they do. The understanding gained from a child's observation of morality and ethics taught through storytelling allows them to participate within their community appropriately.

Specific animals are used as characters to symbolize specific values and views of the culture in the storytelling, where listeners are taught through the actions of these characters. In the Lakota tribe, coyotes are often portrayed as a trickster characters, demonstrating negative behaviors like greed, recklessness, and arrogance while bears and foxes are usually viewed as wise, noble, and morally upright characters from which children learn to model. In these stories, trickster characters often get into trouble, thus teaching children to avoid exhibiting similar negative behaviors. The reuse of characters calls for a more predictable outcome that children can more easily understand.

=== Social exclusion ===
Intergroup exclusion context provides an appropriate platform to investigate the interplay of these three dimensions of intergroup attitudes and behaviors: prejudice, stereotypes, and discrimination. Developmental scientists working from a Social Domain-Theory perspective have focused on methods that measure children's reasoning about exclusion scenarios. This approach has helped distinguish which concerns children attend to when presented with a situation where exclusion occurs. Exclusion from a peer group could raise concerns about moral issues (e.g., fairness and empathy towards excluded), social-conventional issues (e.g., traditions and social norms set by institutions and groups), and personal issues (e.g., autonomy, individual preferences related to friendships), and these can coexist depending on the context in which the exclusion occurs. In intergroup as well as intergroup contexts, children need to draw on knowledge and attitudes related to their own social identities, other social categories, the social norms associated with these categories as well as moral principles about the welfare of the excluded, and fair treatment, to make judgments about social exclusion. The importance of morality arises when the evaluation process of social exclusion requires one to deal with not only the predisposed tendencies of discrimination, prejudice, stereotypes, and bias but also the internal judgments about justice equality and individual rights, which may prove to be a very complex task since it often evokes conflicts and dilemmas coming from the fact that the components of the first often challenge the components of the latter.

Findings from a Social Domain Theory perspective show that children are sensitive to the context of exclusion and pay attention to different variables when judging or evaluating exclusion. These variables include social categories, the stereotypes associated with them, children's qualifications as defined by prior experience with an activity, personality and behavioral traits that might be disruptive for group functioning, and conformity to conventions as defined by group identity or social consensus. In the absence of information, stereotypes can be used to justify the exclusion of a member of an out-group. One's personality traits and whether he or she conforms to socially accepted behaviors related to identity also provide further criteria for social acceptance and inclusion by peers. Also, research has documented the presence of a transition occurring at the reasoning level behind the criteria of inclusion and exclusion from childhood to adolescence. Children get older, they become more attuned to issues of group functioning and conventions and weigh them in congruence with issues of fairness and morality.

=== Allocation of resources ===
Resource allocation is a critical part of the decision-making process for individuals in public responsibility and authority (e.g., health care providers). When resources become scarce, such as in rural communities experiencing situations when there is not enough food to feed everyone, authorities in a position to make decisions that affect this community can create conflicts on various levels (e.g., personally, financially, socially, etc.). The moral conflict that arises from these decisions can be divided into a focus of conflict and a focus of moral conflict. The locus, or the place where conflict occurs, can develop from multiple sources, which include “any combination of personal, professional, organizational, and community values. The focus of conflict occurs from competing values held by stakeholders and financial investors. As K. C. Calman stated in regards to the reallocation of resources in a medical setting, resources must be thought of as money and in the form of skills, time, and faculties.

The healthcare system has many examples where morality and resource allocation has ongoing conflicts. Concerns of morality arise when the initiation, continuation, and withdrawal of intensive care affect a patient well being due to medical decision making. Sox, Higgins, & Owens (2013) offer guidelines and questions for medical practitioners to consider, such as: “How should I interpret new diagnostic information? How do I select the appropriate diagnostic test? How do I choose among several risky treatments?” Withholding and withdrawing life-sustaining treatment in the United States have had a moral consensus that there are no differences between these two therapies. However, even though a political decision offers support for medical practitioner's decision making, there continues to be difficulty withdrawing life-sustaining treatments.

== See also ==
- Character education
- Happy victimizing
- Hero
- Justice
- Just war doctrine
- Moral identity
- Religion
- Science of morality
- Social cognitive theory of morality
- Triune ethics theory
- Values education
