= Moral character =

Steady moral qualities in people

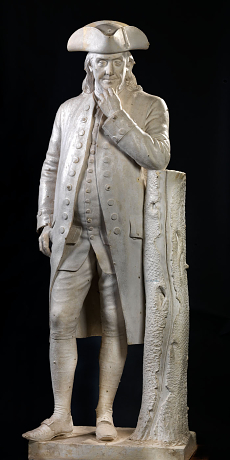
Benjamin Franklin wrote in his autobiography about his habitual efforts to improve his moral character.

Moral character or character (derived from charaktêr) is an analysis of an individual's steady moral qualities. The concept of character can express a variety of attributes, including the presence or lack of virtues such as empathy, courage, fortitude, honesty, and loyalty, or of good behaviors or habits; these attributes are also a part of one's soft skills.

Moral character refers to a collection of qualities that differentiate one individual from another – although on a cultural level, the group of moral behaviors to which a social group adheres can be said to unite and define it culturally as distinct from others.

Psychologist Lawrence Pervin defines moral character as "a disposition to express behavior in consistent patterns of functions across a range of situations". The philosopher Marie I. George refers to moral character as the "sum of one’s moral habits and dispositions". Aristotle said, "we must take as a sign of states of character the pleasure or pain that ensues on acts."

== Overview ==
The word "character" is derived from the Ancient Greek word "charaktêr", referring to a mark impressed upon a coin. Later it came to mean a point by which one thing was told apart from others. There are two approaches when dealing with moral character: Normative ethics involve moral standards that exhibit right and wrong conduct. It is a test of proper behavior and determining what is right and wrong. Applied ethics involve specific and controversial issues along with a moral choice, and tend to involve situations where people are either for or against the issue.

In 1982 Campbell & Bond proposed the following as major sources in influencing character and moral development: heredity, early childhood experience, modeling by important adults and older youth, peer influence, the general physical and social environment, the communications media, the teachings of schools and other institutions, and specific situations and roles that elicit corresponding behavior.

In the military field, character is considered particularly relevant in the leadership development area. Military leaders should not only "know" theoretically the moral values but they must embody these values. Military leaders are expected to lead by example. They demonstrate values and behaviors that they expect their subordinates to follow. Military leaders face ethical and morally challenging issues. Strong moral character is crucial for making these decisions, especially when the consequences of these decisions affect the lives of those under their command.

== History ==
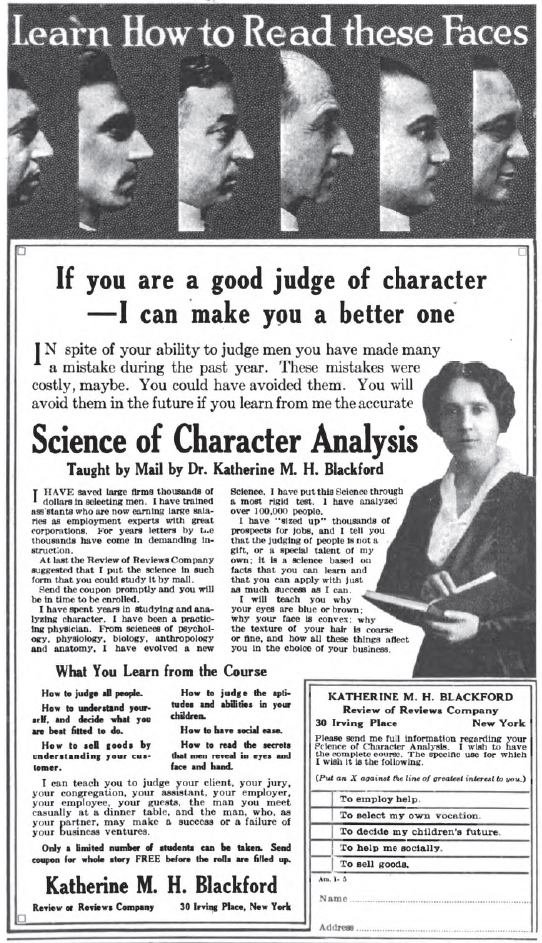
1915 magazine ad

The Stanford Encyclopedia of Philosophy provides a historical account of some important developments in philosophical approaches to moral character. A lot of attention is given to Plato, Aristotle, and Karl Marx's views, since they all follow the idea of moral character after the Greeks. Marx accepts Aristotle's insight that virtue and good character are based on a sense of self-esteem and self-confidence.

Plato believed that the soul is divided into three parts of desire: Rational, Appetitive, and Spirited. In order to have moral character, we must understand what contributes to our overall good and have our spirited and appetitive desires educated properly, so that they can agree with the guidance provided by the rational part of the soul. According to Plato, Moral Character is directly linked to and understanding contributions to the overall good. Associating reason and wisdom allows for individuals to discern the true nature of what is good.

Aristotle tells us that there are people who exhibit excellences – excellences of thought and excellences of character. His phrase for excellences of character – êthikai aretai – we usually translate as moral virtue or moral excellence. When we speak of a moral virtue or an excellence of character, the emphasis is on the combination of qualities that make an individual the sort of ethically admirable person that he is. Aristotle defines virtuous character in Book II of the Nicomachean Ethics: "Excellence of character, then, is a state concerned with choice, lying in a mean relative to us, this being determined by reason and in the way in which the man of practical wisdom would determine it. Now it is a mean between two vices, that which depends on excess and that which depends on defect". In Aristotle's view, good character is based on two naturally occurring psychological responses that most people experience without difficulty: our tendency to take pleasure from self-realizing activity and our tendency to form friendly feelings toward others under specific circumstances. Based on his view, virtually everyone is capable of becoming better and is responsible for actions that express (or could express) their character.

Abraham Lincoln once said that character is like a tree and reputation like its shadow. "The shadow is what we think of it; the tree is the real thing."

In 1919, Albert Einstein wrote in a letter to his friend, Dutch physicist Hendrik Lorentz, about his disillusionment concerning the inhumane consequences of World War I. He noted “We must remember that, on the average, men’s moral qualities do not greatly vary from country to country”.

== Religious views ==
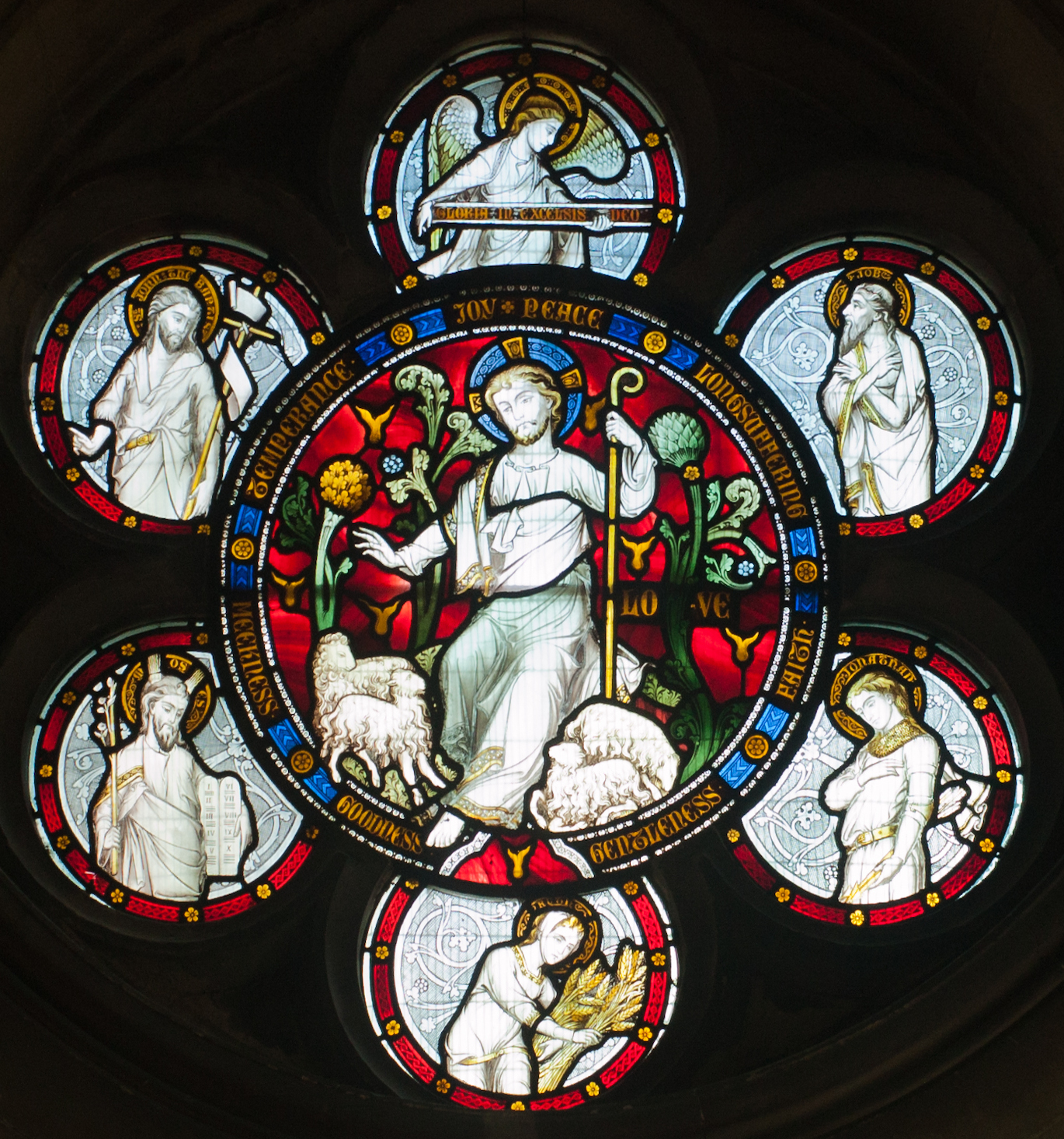
Stained glass window at Christ Church Cathedral in Dublin, depicting the Fruit of the Holy Spirit along with role models representing them.

Christian character is also defined as presenting the "Fruit of the Holy Spirit": love, joy, peace, patience, kindness, goodness, faithfulness, gentleness, and self-control. Doctrines of grace and total depravity assert that – due to original sin – mankind, entirely or in part, was unable to be good without God's intervention; otherwise at best, one could only ape good behavior for selfish reasons.

The Islamic religion is highly concerned with moral character which is presented in many of their teachings. There are strong beliefs that society as a whole has the potential to grow in the values of virtue. Certain writing states that all Muslims have the obligation to bring truth to light as well as to prevent evil. The ideology that to be a morally correct individual, there must be a belief in God is represented in many teachings.

Religion and morality are interconnected; however, are not synonymous. While religion depends on morality, the relationship between the two can vary across cultures, systematic beliefs, and individuals. There are many religions such as Christianity, Islam, and Hinduism that provide their followers with moral guidelines, emphasizing those found within their sacred texts. However it is important to realize that individual beliefs can vary from religious beliefs, contributing to the complexity of moral character.

== Scientific experiments ==
There have been a number of experiments to try to empirically examine moral character.

In one experiment that was done in the United States in 1985, a moral decision made by people was influenced by whether or not they had found a dime in a public phone booth. The findings were that 87% of subjects who found a dime in a phone booth mailed a sealed and addressed envelope that was left at the booth in an apparent mistake by someone else, while only 4% of those who did not find a dime helped. This suggested that transient chance factors may matter more than fixed moral character in someone's choice whether to help others. John M. Doris raises the issue of ecological validity – do experimental findings reflect phenomena found in natural contexts. He recognizes that these results are counterintuitive to the way most of us think about morally relevant behavior.

Another experiment asked college students at Cornell University to predict how they would behave when faced with one of several moral dilemmas, and to make the same predictions for their peers. Again and again, people predicted that they would be more generous and kind than others. Yet when put into the moral dilemma, the subjects did not behave as generously or as kindly as they had predicted. In psychological terms, the experimental subjects were successfully anticipating the base rate of moral behavior and accurately predicting how often others, in general, would be self-sacrificing.

A study conducted by Philip Zimbardo in the 1970's titled 'The Stanford Prison Experiment' can be used to shed light on the workings of moral character related to roles of power. College students were randomly assigned roles of either a powerless prisoner or a guard in a position of authority. From there participants were told to be completely immersed in their assigned roles. Guards were given few regulations and were allowed to create many of their own rules. The experiment was cut short due to signs of abuse from the guards as well as psychological distress from the prisoners. The study showed how roles of power can tie detrimental behavior to every day individuals thus affecting their moral character. The scientific validity of the experiment has been critiqued.

== See also ==
- Character education – Umbrella term used to describe a variety of educational systems
- Ethics – Philosophical study of morality
- Moral agency – Ability to make ethical judgements
- Moral enhancement – Use of biotechnology to improve one's character
- Moral identity – Concept in moral psychology
- Moral psychology – Interdisciplinary field of study

== Bibliography ==
- Blum, Lawrence (2003). "Review of Doris's Lack of Character", Notre Dame Philosophical Reviews.
- Homiak, Marcia (2008). "Moral Character", The Stanford Encyclopedia of Philosophy (Fall Edition), Edward N. Zalta (ed.).
