= Alterity =

Philosophical concept of "otherness"

In philosophy and anthropology, alterity is the state of being "other" or different (Latin alter). It describes the experience of encountering something or someone perceived as distinct from oneself or one's own group. The concept of alterity explores how we understand and relate to those who are seen as different, and how this "otherness" shapes identity and social relations. While rooted in academic discourse, the term is also increasingly used more broadly to describe anything outside of established norms or conventions.

== Philosophy ==
Within the phenomenological tradition, alterity is usually understood as the entity in contrast to which an identity is constructed, and it implies the ability to distinguish between self and not-self, and consequently to assume the existence of an alternative viewpoint. The concept was further developed by Emmanuel Levinas in a series of essays, collected in Altérité et transcendance (Alterity and Transcendence) (1995).

Jadranka Skorin-Kapov in The Aesthetics of Desire and Surprise: Phenomenology and Speculation, relates alterity or otherness to newness and surprise, "The signification of the encounter with otherness is not in its novelty (or banal newness); On the contrary, newness has signification because it reveals otherness, because it allows the experience of otherness. Newness is related to surprise, it is a consequence of the encounter... Metaphysical desire is the receptivity of irreducible otherness. Surprise is the consequence of the encounter. Between desire and surprise there is a pause, a void, a rupture, an immediacy that cannot be captured and presented."

=== Castoriadis ===
For Cornelius Castoriadis (L'institution imaginaire de la société, 1975; The Imaginary Institution of Society, 1997) radical alterity/otherness (French: altérité radicale) denotes the element of creativity in history: "For what is given in and through history is not the determined sequence of the determined but the emergence of radical otherness, immanent creation, non-trivial novelty."

=== Baudrillard ===
For Jean Baudrillard (Figures de l'alterité, 1994; Radical Alterity, 2008), alterity is a precious and transcendent element and its loss would seriously impoverish a world culture of increasing sameness and "arrogant, insular cultural narcissism."

=== Spivak ===
Gayatri Chakravorty Spivak's theory of alterity was introduced in a 2014 symposium titled Remaking History, the intention of which was to challenge the masculine orthodoxy of history writing.

According to Spivak, it is imperative for one to uncover the histories and inherent historical behaviors in order to exercise an individual right to authentic experience, identity and reality. Within the concept of socially constructed histories one "must take into account the dangerous fragility and tenacity of these concept-metaphors."

Spivak recalls her personal history: "As a postcolonial, I am concerned with the appropriation of 'alternative history' or 'histories'. I am not a historian by training. I cannot claim disciplinary expertise in remaking history in the sense of rewriting it. But I can be used as an example of how historical narratives are negotiated. The parents of my parents' grandparents' grandparents were made over, not always without their consent, by the political, fiscal and educational intervention of British imperialism, and now I am independent. Thus I am, in the strictest sense, a postcolonial."

Spivak uses four "master words" to identify the modes of being that create alterity: "Nationalism, Internationalism, Secularism and Culturalism." Furthermore, tools for developing alternative histories include: "gender, race, ethnicity, class".

=== Other thinkers ===
Jeffery Nealon, in Alterity Politics: Ethics and Performative Subjectivity, argues that "ethics is constituted as an inexorable affirmative response to different identities, not through an inability to understand or totalize the other."

There is included a long article on alterity in the University of Chicago's Theories of Media: Keywords Glossary by Joshua Wexler. Wexler writes: "Given the various theorists' formulations presented here, the mediation of alterity or otherness in the world provides a space for thinking about the complexities of self and other and the formation of identity."

The concept of alterity is used in theology and in spiritual books meant for general readers. This is not out of place because, for believers in the Judeo-Christian tradition, God is the ultimate 'Other'. Alterity has also been used to describe the goal of many Christians, to become themselves deeply "other" than the usual norms of behavior and patterns of thought of the secular culture at large. Enzo Bianchi in Echoes of the Word expresses this well, "Meditation always seeks to open us to alterity, love and communion by guiding us toward the goal of having in ourselves the same attitude and will that were in Christ Jesus."

== Anthropology ==
In anthropology, alterity has been used by scholars such as Nicholas Dirks, Johannes Fabian, Michael Taussig and Pauline Turner Strong to refer to the construction of "cultural others".

== Musicology ==
The term has gained further use in seemingly somewhat remote disciplines, e.g., historical musicology where it is employed by John Michael Cooper in a study of Johann Wolfgang von Goethe and Felix Mendelssohn.

== See also ==
- Abjection
- Allosemitism
- Black-and-white dualism
- Decolonization
- Dehumanization
- Heterogeneity
- Heterophenomenology
- Imperialism
- Indeterminacy in philosophy
- Infrahumanisation
- Internationalism
- Moral exclusion
- Nationalism
- Other
- Pedagogy
- Personhood
- Postcolonialism
- Racial inequality in the United States
- Secularism
- Self-consciousness
- Stranger danger
- Subjectivity
- Uncanny
