= Psychology of genocide =

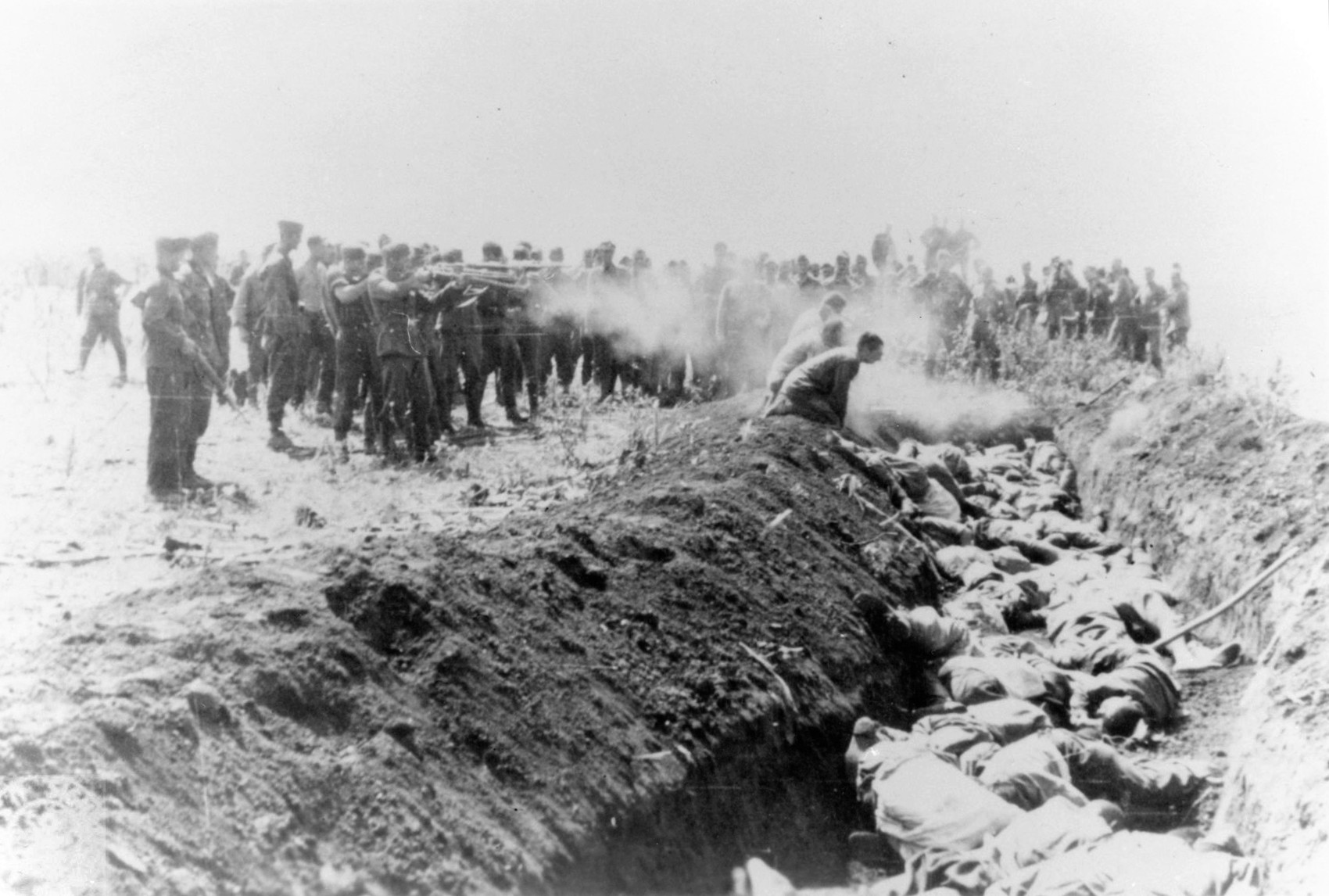
Picture an unidentified German unit executing Soviet civilians, Babi Yar, Ukrainian SSR 1941

The psychology of genocide attempts to explain genocide by means of psychology. Psychology of genocide aims to explain the preconditions of genocide and why some people become genocide perpetrators while others are bystanders or rescuers.

== Preconditions ==
Psychologists have agreed that specific prerequisites stimulate the act of genocide:

1. Ervin Staub's model of frustration elicits that the depletion of basic human needs, such as economic stability, sparks collective frustration.
2. This leads to the introduction of a scapegoat, who is construed as the root source of their poor living standards and the in-group are depicted as victims. The selection of a scapegoat follows a process that results in the total domination of the in-group and the profound devaluation of the chosen scapegoat.
3. Pre-existing differences between the ingroup and the target group, such as ethnic or religious contrasts, radically shift to become immensely damaging to the livelihood of the in-group. For instance, the 2 million Armenians living in Ottoman Turkey were marginalised for their belief in Christianity.
4. The subsequent stage is that the perpetrators create an ideology emphasising that a utopian state can become a reality in the near-term. They play on people's fears and highlight that the sole means to survive is to systematically eradicate the scapegoat. The leading perpetrators begin to construct a mythological explanation that aims to eliminate empathy and compassion directed towards the target group. Minister of Propaganda, Joseph Goebbels, for instance, showcased a myriad of films from 1933 to 1945 dehumanising Jews, portraying them as a lethal virus. Their political leaders aim to commandeer the moral consciousness of their society and force an illusion of unanimity to gain total state control.

== Perpetrators ==
Perpetrators are the individuals who carry out, facilitate, or instruct the annihilation of a specific group. Psychologists have historically debated whether dispositional or situational variables hold greater validity as explanations for the behaviour of perpetrators.

=== Dispositional variables ===
Theodor W. Adorno postulated that possessing an authoritarian personality is the most integral cause of perpetrators' violence. He concluded that the three integral components of authoritarianism are conventionalism, submission to authority, and aggression. Perpetrators also share the behaviour of killing without remorse, which enables them to repeat more violent atrocities. Adorno's findings were derived from the 30 item F scale, which measured the extent to which participants agreed with authoritarian statements. One of the items is "Respect for authority is the most important virtue children should learn".

=== Situational variables ===
Milgram contends that obedience plays a significant role in transforming ordinary humans into transgressive perpetrators. His study measured the degree to which participants would administer shocks to learners just because the experimenter instructed them to do so. He found that, due to the effects of probing by the experimenter, 65% of participants obeyed instructions to the highest level (450 volts). Therefore, Milgram concluded that the perpetrators' inner moral conflicts may be moderated by precise situational arrangements.

Richard Solomon hypothesised that restorative processes could cause brutal behaviour. Such homeostatic processes, which cause habituation may also bring about cruelty in response to aversive stimuli, which could explain perpetrators' excessive torture and violence. Later theorists concluded the divide between situational and dispositional variables is a false dichotomy as the power of the situation can result in a perpetual shift in an individual's personality.

== Bystanders ==
Bystanders are individuals who remain passive and silent when witnessing the ethnic cleansing of a target group. Bystanders have also been regarded as semi-active, as many freely accept the benefits of being a member of the in-group while actively avoiding the victims, such as companies firing Jewish employees.

=== Internal bystanders ===
According to Zilmer and Harrower, bystanders are characterised as ambient, which is defined as individuals who lack sufficient emotional development and must rely on others for guidance. They also have lower levels of moral development, which leads to a more compliant and submissive personality. The same study found that a critical justification for limited emotional development is a failing attachment to a primary caregiver, who becomes instrumental in foreshadowing their apathetic behaviour. In McFarland-Icke's study of nurses in Nazi Germany, she concluded that the lack of resistance to perpetrators results from the bystanders' inability to engage in higher-order processes such as deductive reasoning and logic.

== Rescuers ==
Rescuers are individuals who actively pursue helping genocide victims survive by providing shelter, protection, or a means of escape.

=== Identity ===
Rescuers are identified as having internalised empathy and moral values, which serve as a diametric contrast to the growing presence of the perpetrators’ ideologies. Theorists have also claimed that a strong sense of individuality is a critical force in driving rescuers’ behaviour. Historian Christopher Browning discovered that an estimated 10-20% of Nazi soldiers evaded killing Jews due to their empathy and belief in individual choice.

=== Socialisation ===
Oliner's observations highlighted that the determining factor for the behaviour of rescuers is the role of the family. He found that mothers of rescuers transferred healthier moral competence and independence goals compared to mothers of non-rescuers. Rescuer families also embodied other codes of ethics, such as valuing collective responsibility and egalitarianism, irrespective of one's ethnicity or beliefs.

== See also ==
- Dehumanization
- Deradicalization
- Incitement to genocide
- Milgram experiment
- Moral disengagement
- Moral psychology
- Holocaust denial
- Genocidal intent
- Compartmentalization
