= Moral disengagement =

Conviction that ethical standards do not apply to oneself

Moral disengagement is a term from developmental psychology, educational psychology and social psychology for the process of convincing the self that ethical standards do not apply to oneself in a particular context. This is done by separating moral reactions from inhumane conduct and disabling the mechanism of self-condemnation. Thus, moral disengagement involves a process of cognitive re-construing or re-framing of destructive behavior as being morally acceptable without changing the behavior or the moral standards.

In social cognitive theory of morality, self-regulatory mechanisms embedded in moral standards and self-sanctions translate moral reasoning into actions, and, as a result, moral agency is exerted. Thus, the moral self is situated in a broader, socio-cognitive self-theory consisting of self-organizing, proactive, self-reflective, and self-regulative mechanisms. Three major sub-functions are operating in this self-regulatory system in which moral agency is grounded. The first sub-function is self-monitoring of one's conduct, which is the initial step of taking control over it. "Action gives rise to self-reactions through a judgmental function in which conduct is evaluated against internal standards and situational circumstances". Thus, moral judgments evoke self-reactive influence. The self-reactive and judgmental mechanisms constitute the second and third sub-function.

Generally, moral standards are adopted to serve as guides for good behavior and as deterrents for bad conduct. Once internalized control has developed, people regulate their actions by the standards they apply to themselves and this give them self-satisfaction and a sense of self-worth. Individuals refrain from behaving in ways that violate their moral standards in order to avoid self-condemnation. Therefore, self-sanctions play a significant role in keeping conduct in line with these internal moral standards and hence also in regulating inhumane conduct. However, moral standards only function as fixed internal regulators of conduct when self-regulatory mechanisms have been activated. Many different social and psychological processes prevent the activation of self-sanction. Selective activation of self-sanctions and internal moral control or disengagement allows for a wide range of behaviour, given the same moral standard.

Moral disengagement functions in the perpetration of inhumanities through moral justification, euphemistic labelling, advantageous comparison, displacing or diffusing responsibility, disregarding or misrepresenting injurious consequences, and dehumanising the victim. Rather than operating independently, these cognitive mechanisms are interrelated within a sociostructural context to promote inhumane conduct in people's daily lives.

Several mechanisms of moral disengagement have been identified by professional psychologists.

== Detailed mechanisms ==
=== Moral justification ===
One method of disengagement is portraying inhumane behavior as though it has a moral purpose in order to make it socially acceptable. Moral justification is the first of a series of mechanisms suggested by Bandura that can induce people to bypass self-sanction and violate personal standards. For example, torture, in order to obtain information necessary to protect the nation's citizens, may be seen as acceptable. This form of disengagement happens before the decision to engage in a behaviour, usually people only engage in reprehensible conduct after they have justified the actions on a moral ground. Through cognitive reconstrual, wrongful behaviours can be perceived as righteous.

Religious principles, nationalistic imperatives and righteous ideologies have long been used as means to justify reprehensible and destructive conducts. One example is the holy terror justified by religious principles documented by Rapport and Alexander.

Moral justifications can be highly effective in influencing public opinion, due to the difficulty in detecting deceptive moral claims. Literature review by Kathleen McGraw found that the difficulty arises from the following four sources.

1. People are generally susceptible to deception.
2. Political communication is usually in the form of media, which eliminates the nonverbal cues that can assist the detection of deception.
3. People become overly focused on the individual due to social judgement biases.
4. Politicians accusing each other of lying is not the norm of political culture, therefore it is not natural for the public to suspect moral claims.

McGraw also identified four variants of moral-claim justifications in politics.

1. Personal ethical standards.
2. Shared political values.
3. Not commonly shared values for example religion-specific principles.
4. A claim of collective benefits.

Among these variants, it is found that justifications which appeal to personal ethical standards and collective social benefits are the most effective in shaping public opinion.

People with high moral principles are not exempt from moral justification. They are less likely to conform to arbitrary social demands; however, when their principles are violated, they are also more likely to display aggressive behaviour towards violators.

=== Euphemistic labelling ===
Using euphemistic language to describe reprehensible conduct is another way that individuals can morally disengage from their moral standards. Language shapes individual thought forms which constitute the basis for courses of action. Activities can take on different "appearances" depending on what names are given or attached them. Euphemistic language is a means to make injurious and harmful behavior respectable and reduce responsibility for it from the person. With the help of intricate rephrasing, detrimental behaviour is made innocuous and acceptable, and people who are part of it are liberated from feeling sense of guilty. Adults are more likely to engage in aggressive conduct when the detrimental act is sanitized than when it is labelled as an aggression.

There exists different varieties of euphemisms. One of them is dependent on sanitizing language. By disguising the deleterious with innocent wordings, the detrimental behaviour itself becomes more respectable. Soldiers "waste" people rather than kill them. Bombing missions are executed in the name of "servicing the target," and for the sake of public utility. Terrorists name themselves as "freedom fighters." The attacks are depicted as "clean, surgical strikes," and the victims are eloquently listed as "collateral damage." Sanitizing euphemism is also commonly used in less abominable daily activities that people perform every day. From the point of view of several government agencies, people are not laid off. Instead they are provided with a "career alternative enhancement", making it look like they are offered a job promotion. The lecturer may teach business students to rephrase lies in competitive business transactions for the sake of closing the deal as "strategic misrepresentation". The nuclear power industry has its own technical set of terms of euphemisms for the detrimental effects caused by nuclear mishaps to the public. An explosion is described as an "energetic dis-assembly," and a reactor accident is labeled as a "normal aberration". Last but not least, plutonium contamination is tagged as "infiltration". The acid rain which imposes destroying effects on lakes and forests has its own euphemistic label of "atmospheric deposition of anthropogenically derived acidic substances".

The agent-less passive style in presenting events is a second linguistic tool with the help of which people can establish the appearance that the blamable and pernicious acts stem from indescribable forces rather than people themselves. People removed themselves from being the agents of their own acts. When a driver explaining to police how he managed to demolish a telephone pole, he said "The telephone pole was approaching. I was attempting to swerve out of its way, when it struck my front end." The specialized jargons of a legitimate enterprise can even be misused under an unlawful circumstance by the outlaw to beautify their harmful behaviours. In the Watergate vocabulary, criminal conspiracy was referred as a "game plan", and the conspirators were relabeled as "team players".

=== Advantageous comparison ===
In addition to moral justification, another mechanism that individuals can deploy to make harmful behavior seem morally acceptable is termed advantageous comparison. This process exploits the contrast principle, which follows the assumption that the perception of human conduct is influenced by what it is compared against. That is, individuals contrast their conduct with other examples of more immoral behavior and in doing this comparison their own behavior is trivialized. The more immoral the contrasting behavior is, the more likely it is that one's destructive behavior will seem less bad. For example, "the massive destruction in Vietnam was minimized by portraying the American military intervention as saving the populace from Communist enslavement".

These so-called exonerating comparisons rely on the moral justification by utilitarian standards. Two sets of judgements facilitate making destructive behavior morally acceptable. Firstly, non-violent alternatives are judged to be ineffective to achieve desired changes and consequently eliminated as options. "Secondly, utilitarian analyses affirm that one's injurious actions will prevent more human suffering than they cause." Albert Bandura suggested that applying the utilitarian calculus in specific situations is "quite slippery" because of the uncertainties that the future contains and the biases in human judgement. According to his belief, the calculation process of estimating the significance of potential threats is subjective.

Bandura also argues that moral justification and advantageous comparison are the most effective "self-disinhibitors" because they eliminate self-censure and change the appreciation of the self in the service of harmful activities. "What was once morally condemnable becomes a source of self-valuation".

=== Displacement of responsibility ===
Another dissociative practice, known as displacement of responsibility, operates by distorting the relationship between actions and the effects they cause. People behave in ways they would normally oppose if a legitimate authority accepts responsibility for the consequences of that behavior. Displacement of responsibility distorts facts. Under these conditions people view their actions as dictates of authorities rather than their own actions.

When people agree to being contributors to adverse results, it leads to strong operation of moral control involving themselves in harmful activity while trying to minimize the effect of that activity. They play the role of an agent of moral disengagement and start to behave in ways they ordinarily disavow if an appropriate authority accepts responsibility for their behavior. Personal liability for conduct drives people to view their actions as coming from authoritative figures under displaced responsibility. Not being the true agents of their actions, they are saved from self-condemnation. Displacement of responsibility revealed gruesome inhumanities through self-exemption in mass executions sanctioned socially. Self-exonerating deference to gruesome orders is evident in military atrocities, such as the My Lai massacre.

Perpetration of inhumanities requires devoted functionaries. If responsibility for their behavior is cast off, they would be unreliable in performance of their duties. A strong sense of responsibility is required to be a good functionary. Responsibility is characterized in two levels: a strong sense of duty towards superiors, and accountability for effects caused by one's actions. Best functionaries honor their obligations towards their authorities and do not feel personally responsible for the effects caused by their actions.

=== Diffusion of responsibility ===
Additionally, there is the practice of diffusion of responsibility. It occurs in a group of people, where with the increasing number of people, the level of diffusion increases. In this phenomenon, a person has lower inclination towards responsibility as they feel that others are also equally responsible in the group. Assumptions are made on the basis that other people are responsible for taking action. Responsibility is diffused by division of labor. Tasks that are subdivided seem harmless and easy to carry out. This shifts attention to the details of their specific job. Decision making in groups is a practice that makes otherwise polite people to behave inhumanely. Collective action provides anonymity, which allows weakening of moral control. Any harmful activity carried out in the group can be associated to others' actions. People in groups act inhumanely when they [are not] personally held accountable for their actions.

Theoretical and practical importance of diffusion of responsibility is neglected in escalation literature, as the most commonly extended definition of escalation for which there is substantial factual support is based on the impression of self-justification. Though initial decisions with regard to new framework are made by people on their own, most imperative decisions are taken by the group in a managerial context. Thus, generally the offered description for persistence in error may be irrelevant or at least have lower relevance to situations of escalation.

Effects of diffusion of responsibility on escalation tendency show that in the initial stages of group projects there is reduced escalation effects in those individuals who take the inaugural steps in a failing project than individuals who are personally held reliable for those initial decisions. Self justification theory is of lower importance in groups than in individuals because most decisions in organizations are taken by groups in form of new policies and regulations. When decisions fail, people subjectively disfigure consequences to make themselves appear more agreeable. This distortion occurs when people try to psychologically safeguard themselves in an attempt to rationalize their actions. People try to justify actions taken previously in the past which leads them to take a failing course of action. Though these actions taken previously lead to escalated commitment, a decision to stay in the same course of action could be damaged by the extent to which a person shares the responsibility for initiating that failing course of action. Even after participating in a decision, an individual can evade responsibility in two ways. The first is where the responsibility or the blame is transferred to the third party for improper action. In this case, a person feels less responsible for the failure caused by them along with the inclination to the failing project. The other way to evade responsibility is when the group takes the initial decision of pursuing the failing project. The blame of a poor decision is shared within the group, allocating less responsibility to each member for the decision than it would have been if the decision was made by one person alone. Social interaction may curtail the propensity to escalate commitment to a defeated course of action by diffusing responsibility for the original decision and discouraging the arousal of intentions to justify previous behavior.

=== Disregarding or misrepresenting injurious consequences ===
Another method of disengagement is through disregard or misrepresentation of the consequences of action. When someone decides to pursue an activity harmful to others for personal advantage, or as a result of impact by social stimulus, they generally either minimize the harm they have caused or attempt to avoid facing it. People willingly begin to recollect prior information regarding the potential benefits of the behavior but are less likely to recall the harmful effects it would cause to others. People are especially inclined to the minimize harmful effects when they act alone. When the harm caused becomes less evident and personalized, people are more likely to execute inhumanities. Apart from selective inattention and subjective cognitive distortion of effects, the misrepresentation of consequences may also involve persistent efforts to eliminate evidence of the damage they cause to others. Therefore, there is little reason for self-censure or moral codes to be triggered as long as the harm is overlooked, minimized, or distorted.

It is relatively easy to hurt others when the detrimental results of one's conduct are ignored, and when causal effects are not visible because they are remote from one's behaviour on the physical and mental level. Mechanized weapon systems and explosive devices that can lead to severe casualty but are controlled by someone at a distance pressing one button are suited examples of such depersonalized action. Even if there exists a high level of personal responsibility in people, they will still execute detrimental behaviors when the harm they inflict on their victims is not realized. Individuals try to cut off the connections between harmful activities and self-sanctions by distorting the consequences associated with a given act. For instance, "use of this mechanism in sport is seen when players avoid finding out the extent of injuries sustained by opponents or deny the seriousness of the injuries of which they are aware". On the contrary, when people are aware of the suffering they cause, indirectly awakened distress and self-censure start to function and serve as self-restraining influences. For example, people are less likely to obey to execute detrimental behaviors as the victim's pain became more evident and personalized.

Nowadays, it is commonly seen that most organizations have a clear set of hierarchical chains where people in the upper level come up with plans and pass them down to their subordinates, known as executors, who then carry them out. It appears that the further away the individuals are from the end results, the more feeble is the binding power of the foreseeable destructive effects. Disengagement of personal control normally exists among people who are situated between the top and the bottom in a hierarchical system because they can get away with the responsibility of formulating the plans, and they are not involved in executing the decisions. As a transmitter, they attempt to model dutiful behavior and further legitimize their superiors. Therefore, intermediaries are much more prone to implement destructive commands than are those who are in charge of coming up with new plans and who are responsible for carrying them out and facing the results.

=== Dehumanization ===
Dehumanization is the process through which a person or group of people is denied 'humanness' or human attributes. The victim is no longer viewed as a person with feelings, hopes, and concerns, but objectified as a lesser sub-human. Dehumanization is identified as one of the mechanisms of moral disengagement, as it justifies treating others with less moral concern and empathy, and therefore validates violent or abusive treatment towards others. Dehumanization involves the moral exclusion and delegitimization of others. Moral exclusion occurs when groups or individuals are excluded from an ingroup's sphere of moral values, rules, and beliefs. Delegitimization is the process of categorizing others into negative social groups, which excludes them from acceptable humanness. Through this process of delegitimization, dehumanization towards others is facilitated, which in turn leads to moral exclusion and the justification of immoral treatment and behavior towards individuals or a group of people.

There are two aspects of dehumanization: the denial of uniquely human attributes and the denial of human nature attributes. Uniquely human attributes refer to those characteristics that discriminate a human from other animal species. Such attributes include morality, rationality, civility, and refinement. Human nature attributes involve characteristics such as warmth, agency, emotionality, and cognitive openness, which discriminate a human from inanimate objects.

When attributing human nature to groups of people, ingroup and outgroup biases come into play. People identify themselves with their social group (ingroup) and dissociate themselves from social groups to which they believe they don't identify with (outgroup).

The denial of uniquely human attributes leads to a metaphor-based dehumanization process which associates the social outgroup to non-humans, comparing them to animals. Ideological and historically embedded beliefs about the human-animal divide create the perception that human beings are superior to all other animals. Therefore, by likening the outgroup to animals, they are perceived as less rational and sophisticated, which ultimately creates a psychological barrier that allows for the justification of negative behavior towards the 'non-human' outgroup. This process of animalistic dehumanization is most commonly established through the use of metaphors. For example, the Nazis regularly compared the Jews to 'rats', and the Hutus interchangeably used the term Tutsis and 'cockroach' in the majority of their propaganda. The use and effectiveness of these metaphors work on the aspect of moral disgust. Many animals, such as snakes, leeches, and rats, tend to strike an unconscious, automatic reaction of disgust, and therefore, by likening an outgroup to these animals, the negative and 'disgusting' attributes of these animals are metaphorically projected onto the outgroup.

The denial of human nature attributes leads to an attribute-based dehumanization process which separates the outgroup from human characteristics involving emotions, therefore likening them to inanimate objects. This process is referred to as mechanistic dehumanization. Due to their human nature attributes being denied, members of the outgroup are perceived as robotic and unemotional, leading the ingroup to be less empathetic towards them.

Infra-humanization theory is another key aspect to dehumanization. It is the belief that one's ingroup is more 'human' than the outgroup in terms of uniquely human attributes and secondary emotions. Whereas primary emotions (surprise, anger, fear) are commonly seen as shared amongst the entire animal kingdom, secondary emotions (hope, remorse, regret) are viewed as purely human characteristics. These secondary emotions are socially determined and seen as essential to humanness. However, ingroups tend to attribute these secondary emotions towards themselves, but deny or lessen the extent of these emotions in the outgroup, thus leading to the out group being portrayed as 'lesser-humans'.

== Antecedents ==
=== Individual differences ===
James R. Detert, Linda K. Treviño and Vicki L. Sweitzer propose that some individuals are more inclined to morally disengage than others. Based on their study, they found that certain individual differences predict and influence moral disengagement.

Specifically, James R. Detert, Linda K. Treviño and Vicki L. Sweitzer found that being more acutely aware of the needs and feelings of others prevents moral disengagement activities. Individuals with high empathy are less likely to morally disengage from acts that would harm others. Further, their study also suggested that trait cynicism is facilitator of moral disengagement. "Individuals high on trait cynicism have an underlying distrust of other people and therefore are more sceptical about motives of others, including targets of harm, and will be more likely to think that such targets deserve their fate". Therefore, trait cynics' lack of trust in others makes the process of distancing themselves from and diffusing responsibility to others easier. The same applies to blaming and dehumanising victims. In addition, they found that chance locus of control orientation is another individual characteristic that is positively related to moral disengagement. That is, people who believe life experiences and outcomes are due to external forces, are more likely to morally disengage. Their findings also shows that the higher self-importance of moral identity the less prone individuals are to moral disengagement. For individuals with a highly self-important moral identity, "moral concerns" and commitments are crucial in their self-definition and self-concept and hence less likely to cognitively re-construe destructive and harmful conduct as being morally acceptable.

=== Interplay of personal and social sanctions ===
Social cognitive theory suggests an interactionist perspective to morality. People do not operate as autonomous moral agents unaffected by the social realities in which they are embedded, and hence moral agency is socially situated. Moral agency is exercised in "particularized ways" depending on the conditions under which people's everyday life transactions are taking place. According to this view, moral actions are therefore the outcome of this reciprocal interplay of personal and social influences. Social cognitive theory lists three different modes of human agency: personal, proxy and collective.

In terms of personal control, in many circumstances, people usually cannot directly control social conditions or institutional practices that affect their daily lives. People would then try by one means or another to get those experts who are resourceful or who can produce influence and power to act at their behest to secure the desirable outcomes. It is impossible to master every aspect of daily life with limited time, energy, and resources.

People also attempt to seek proxy control in areas where they can exert direct influence when they have not developed the means to do so, they believe others can achieve better results, or they do not want to involve themselves into burdensome aspects that direct control causes. To maintain effective control under the evolving conditions of life, it requires mastery of knowledge and skills which are only attainable through continued investment of time, effort, and resources.

The collective agency stems from human beings' characteristics of socializing. Human beings are social animals. Inevitably, people are involved in a variety of relationships with others. And in many circumstances progress is only achievable with socially interdependent effort. Therefore, people often cooperate with others to secure what they cannot accomplish individually. People's shared belief is a key ingredient of collective agency. People acting collectively on a shared belief, not as an inane [sic?] member of a group is what is performing the cognizing, aspiring, motivating and regulating functions for the society.

== Consequences ==
=== Unethical decision making and deceptive behavior ===
Albert Bandura argued that when considering the various mechanisms of moral disengagement, humane personal standards are not enough to renounce inhumane conduct. Civilised life demands safeguards as an integral part of social systems to uphold moral personal control and "compassionate" conduct.

In investigating the outcomes of moral disengagement, James R. Detert, Linda K. Treviño, and Vicki L. Sweitzer found empirical evidence supporting their hypothesis that moral disengagement is positively associated with making unethical decisions. Higher levels of moral disengagement lead to increased likelihood of unethical decision making. A disconnect between internal moral standards and "contemplated actions" reduces the activation of internalized deterrents that otherwise would prevent people from acting unethically.

Adam Barsky investigated the effects of moral disengagement and participation in unethical work behavior across two studies. The research focused on moral disengagement through moral justification and displacement of responsibility and unethical behavior as deceptive behaviors such as "outright lying", and "attempts to obscure the truth". Both of Adam Barsky's studies also empirically demonstrated a significant relation between moral disengagement and people's likelihood of unethical decision making, in organizational literature. In the second study, Adam Barsky found empirical evidence that participation in goal-setting, that is, a joint decision making process, is positively related to deceptive behavior. "Perhaps most interesting, while moral justifications tended to increase in the reported incidents of unethical behavior, this was only true when employees did not feel that they had the opportunity to participate in setting their performance goals at work."

McGraw, Best, and Timpone found important consequences of moral justifications in the field of politics. They found that a controversial decision will be evaluated more positively due to moral justifications. Judgement of character can also be influenced, and as a result, the politician involved will receive more positive public opinions. McGraw concluded that moral justifications can be used deceptively by politicians to influence public opinion on controversies and to reinforce their own reputations without the fear of negative consequences.

In the field of sports, a relationship between moral disengagement and athletes' justification of cheating was found. Šukys analyzed different forms of cheating and found that athletes' justification of deceptive behaviors, which are related to the manipulations of sports rules and results of contests, is predicted by moral disengagement in sport.

=== Military conduct ===
Destructive behaviour as a result of moral justification can often be found in military conduct. Killing, which is usually perceived as morally condemnable, can be cognitively reconstructed into even a source of pride. As a result, people can be transformed into skilled combatants surprisingly fast. This is further facilitated by nonviolent options being judged as ineffective, and from a utilitarian point of view, when the suffering caused by the foe outweighs the suffering inflicted by violent conducts.

Kimhi and Sagy investigated the association between moral justification of army roadblocks and Israeli soldiers' feelings of adjustment. The results supported their hypothesis that the more justification of army roadblocks by the soldiers, the higher level of cognitive, affective and behavioural adjustment they felt.

Moral justifications are often used by terrorists to defend their atrocious conduct. On the other hand, the justification of counterterrorist measures is a moral dilemma especially faced by democratic societies; the loss of innocent lives during these measures has to be justified while obeying a civilised society's moral codes.

=== Aggression ===
Studies indicate that bullying is positively related to self-reported moral disengagement in children and in adolescents. It is also found that higher levels of disengaged justifications predicted higher levels of traditional bullying.

Pornari and Wood found that in addition to traditional peer aggression, moral disengagement is also associated with cyber aggression.

Further studies by Thornberg and Jungert found that among schoolchildren, significantly higher levels of moral disengagement including moral justification, euphemistic labelling, diffusion of responsibility, distorting consequences and victim attribution was expressed by boys. The number of incidences of bullying was also significantly higher in boys than girls. Among all the moral disengagement mechanisms, only moral justification and victim attribution were significantly related to bullying.

=== Moral disengagement in routinely performed self-serving activities ===
Traditionally, moral disengagement theory has been applied mainly to high moral intensity scenarios and behaviors such as interpersonal aggression, stealing or deception, and armed conflicts, which Bandura termed "extraordinary circumstances". But the role of moral disengagement in everyday situations – in which people routinely perform self-serving activities at injurious costs to others and the environment – is also receiving increased attention. In particular, recent studies have observed moral disengagement as a situated cognitive process in meat consumption. One study found that meat-eaters consider traditionally edible animals less capable of experiencing refined emotions, even though meat-eaters and vegetarians did not differ in their evaluations of non-food animals. Researchers also found that individuals with higher levels of moral disengagement in meat consumption tend to show lower levels of general empathy, experience less self-evaluative emotional reactions (i.e. guilt and shame) when considering the impact of meat consumption, endorse group-based discrimination within humans (social dominance orientation), and display power motives of dominance and support of hierarchy of humans over other species (speciesism, human supremacy beliefs). Additionally, they also tend to display higher general propensity to morally disengage, attribute less importance to moral traits in how they view themselves (moral identity), and eat meat more often.

== See also ==
- Authority bias
- Banality of evil
- Bystander effect
- Cognitive dissonance
- Compassion fatigue
- Diffusion of responsibility
- Moral exclusion
- Moral relativism
- Moral responsibility
- Necessary evil
- Psychology of genocide
- Rationalization (psychology)
- Situational ethics
- Situationism (psychology)
