= Delegitimisation =

Sociopsychological process of taking perceived authority away from something

Delegitimisation (also spelled delegitimization) is the withdrawal of legitimacy, usually from some institution such as a state, cultural practice, etc. which may have acquired it explicitly or implicitly, by statute or accepted practice. It is a sociopsychological process which undermines or marginalises an entity by presenting facts and/or value judgments that are construed to withdraw legitimacy and can in some cases be a self-justifying mechanism, with the ultimate goal of justifying harm of an outgroup.

The concept applies to a wide spectrum of social contexts ranging from disputes about political entities to chronic illnesses.

== Definition, function and mechanisms ==
Delegitimisation is the process of constructing a "categorization of groups into extreme social categories which are ultimately excluded from society". Delegitimisation provides "the moral and the discursive basis to harm the delegitimized group, even in the most inhumane ways".

Daniel Bar-Tal identified five rhetorical strategies by which delegitimisation occurs: dehumanisation (e.g. "uncivilised savages"), trait characterisation ("idiots", "parasites"), outcasting ("murderers", "terrorists"), use of political labels ("Nazis", "imperialists"), and delegitimisation by group comparison (e.g. with the Huns). Volpato et al. found eight delegitimising strategies, including trait characterisation, political labels, group comparison, segregation, outcasting and using a delegitimised group to stigmatise another group. For example, images of derogated target groups were published in the Italian Fascist magazine La Difesa della Razza in the 1930s.

A process affecting actual beliefs rather than mere rhetoric is presumed to be at work however. An early controlled study published in 1960 showed that "serious and violent conflict can change previously held positive views of the other group" as in the case of the 1959 border disputes between India and China, eventually leading to the 1962 Sino-Indian War. "Before the dispute, Indian students considered the Chinese to be artistic, religious, industrious, friendly, progressive, and honest. But, as the conflict developed, the Chinese were stereotyped by the same Indian students also as aggressive, cheating, selfish, war-mongering, cruel and shrewd."

Bar-Tal found that the process mostly occurs in the cases of intractable conflicts and ethnocentrism. According to Bar-Tal, in these contexts delegitimisation is part of an unholy trinity together with beliefs in justness of own goals and collective self-victimhood.

== History and examples ==
In 1975, "delegitimisation" became a kind of "buzz word" when then-U.S. Ambassador to the United Nations Daniel Patrick Moynihan accused the international body of delegitimising Israel by passing a "Zionism is racism" resolution. After U.S. president Barack Obama included the word in a 2011 speech, it developed wider international currency.

The paired concepts of "legitimise" and "delegitimise" have gained currency in discussions about nuclear disarmament.

Arthur Kleinman found that a patients with a chronic illness experience delegitimation when doctors treat their description of pain or other symptoms as exaggerated or even untrue.

== See also ==
- Argumentum ad hominem
- Demonization
- Legitimation
- Protracted social conflict
- Red herring
- Stereotype
- Tabula rasa
- Transitology
