= Demonization =

Characterization of individuals, groups, or political bodies as evil

Demonization or demonisation is the reinterpretation of the deities of polytheistic religions as evil, lying demons by other religions, generally by monotheistic and henotheistic ones. The term has since been expanded to refer to any characterization of individuals, groups, or political bodies as evil.

== Religion ==
Religions, even those that are radically monotheistic, do not necessarily deny the existence of other gods or spiritual beings. On the contrary, they claim some of the other gods are not worthy of worship and in actuality are demons who mislead followers from proper belief or practice. Christian missionaries often employed demonization tactics when converting pagans, although Judaism, Islam, and other religions have similar histories. Demonization is not limited to focusing on other religions but can also be directed inward to condemn various schools of thought or movements.

From a secular viewpoint, demonization can be used to denigrate an opposed individual or group, making adherents to one's own religion or viewpoint less inclined to do business with them (and possibly convert) and more inclined to fight against them. If foreigners are evil and corrupted by demonic influence, then any means of self-defense is easily portrayed as legitimate. The portrayal of almost all pagans in the Middle East as Baal worshippers in the Hebrew Bible is an example of this. If pagans are corrupted by the demon "god" Baal, then clearly they must be fought or at least oppressed. Especially in the earlier books of the Hebrew Bible, foreign deities are portrayed as existing and corrupting entities rather than being mere powerless idols. Some would argue this later transferred to Christianity after Constantine I's ascension in its suppression of Roman paganism. Some of the best-known of these demonizations are those of Lucifer, Beelzebub and Baphomet, these having progressed to such an extent that their names actually became synonymous with that of the devil/satan of Abrahamic religions. Later, the language of demonization would be invoked with the rise in Antisemitism in Iberia, leading to the Expulsion of Jews from Spain including the Moriscos.

The view of early Judaism treating foreign deities as devils and later Judaism treating them as nonexistent is not universal. Psalms 96:5, for example, is alternately translated as, "For all the Gods of the gentiles are nothing," "For all the Gods of the gentiles are devils" (Vulgate), and "For all the gods of the peoples are idols." (NRSV) The Greek Septuagint translation of that passage, used by the early Christian Church, used the "devils" version. Jerome would follow the Greek text rather than the Hebrew when he translated the Latin Vulgate edition of the Bible. The "devils" epithet would still appear in Bibles up until the end of the 20th century when the consensus reverted to the original Hebrew text for modern translations.

Analogs to demonization exist outside monotheistic religions, as well. Polytheism easily accepts foreign gods in general, and in times of conflict, a foreign nation's gods would sometimes be portrayed as evil. Less commonly, it would be applied to other religions as well. For example, Buddha's portrayal in Hinduism varies: Some strains of Hinduism consider the Buddha an incarnation of Vishnu while in some texts such as the Puranas, he is portrayed as an avatar born to mislead those who deny the Vedic knowledge. (Note: The reverse is found in Buddhist texts which similarly caricature Hindu sacred figures. According to Alf Hiltebeitel and other scholars, some of the stories in Buddha-related Jataka tales found in Pali texts seem slanderous distortions of Hindu legends, but these may reflect the ancient local traditions and the complexities of early interaction between the two Indian religions.)

=== Political conflicts ===
Demonization is sometimes used against what are arguably political opponents rather than religious ones. The Knights Templar were destroyed by accusations from King Philip the Fair that they worshipped Baphomet. Baphomet, often thought to be Beelzebub, may have been used because of the likeness of this horned deity with the Christian images of Satan.

== Modern usage ==
In colloquial usage, the term demonization is used metaphorically to refer to propaganda or moral panic directed against any individual or group, for the purpose of defamation, character assassination and/or dehumanization.

== See also ==
- Black propaganda
- Dehumanization
- Delegitimization
- Demonizing the enemy
- Idealization and devaluation
- Scapegoating
