= Moral exclusion =

Moral exclusion is a psychological process where members of a group view their own group and its norms as superior to others, belittling, marginalizing, excluding, even dehumanizing targeted groups. A distinction should be drawn between active exclusion and omission. The former requires intent and is a form of injustice, known as moral exclusion; while the latter is thoughtlessness. The targeted group is viewed as undeserving of morally mandated rights and protections. When conflict between groups escalates, the in-group/out-group bias between the groups heightens. Severe violence between groups can be either the antecedent or the outcome of moral exclusion. At its extreme it is a bidirectional phenomenon that defies precise origin.

== Scholars ==
- Morton Deutsch; Professor emeritus of psychology and education and founder of the International Center for Cooperation and Conflict Resolution (ICCCR) at the Teachers College at Columbia University, Deutsch conducted studies on cooperation and competition, intergroup relations, conflict resolution, social conformity, and the social psychology of justice during his career.
- Susan Opotow; Received her PhD in social psychology from Columbia University in 1987. Opotow's research focuses on moral exclusion that occurs in adolescents' interpersonal conflicts with peers.
- Ervin Staub; Emeritus professor of psychology at University of Massachusetts, Amherst. Staub was born in Hungary, Staub fled from Nazism and communism to Vienna before making his way to the U.S. where he earned a PhD at Stanford. He is the founding director of the PhD concentration in the psychology of peace and violence at the University of Massachusetts.
- Henri Tajfel; Minimal group paradigm shows that "othering" is the basis for discrimination. Tajfel's intention was to create groups with as little meaning as possible and then add meaning to discover at what point discrimination would occur.

== History ==
Throughout the course of history there have been instances in which human beings treat others as less than human and undeserving of equal moral treatment. Occurrences such as the Nazi Genocide during World War II and the African slave trade have led researchers to question whether or not human beings have the tendency to deem others as worthy or unworthy of moral treatment. Furthermore, if it were the case that humans label one another as acceptable or unacceptable and treat each other accordingly, it is important to examine the rationalization that occurs during this process. This is the type of thinking that spurred Morton Deutsch, Susan Opotow and Ervin Staub to investigate the processes of dehumanization and moral exclusion.

Susan Sutherland Isaacs, and other members of the object-relations school of psychoanalysis, set the stage for moral exclusion research with the theory that perceiving certain people as allies and others as enemies is intrinsic to human nature. This categorization of persons creates a marked distinction between good and bad, leading to the exclusion of those who are negatively perceived from the moral community. Deutsch, Opotow and Staub have defined the moral community, or scope of justice, to be a "...psychological boundary for fairness, within which concerns with justice and moral rules govern our conduct". Such exclusion has been thought to be evolutionary, as it is beneficial to individuals to avoid others who are harmful and seek out those that are helpful.

Henri Tajfel conducted multiple experiments that returned the conclusion that people's "...actions are unambiguously directed at favouring the members of their ingroup as against the members of the outgroup. Moreover, Tajfel reported that individuals can be placed in an outgroup for any number of reasons, including (but not limited to), "ideology, skin color, age, and cognitive capacity." Given these findings, the assumption can be made that human beings have an innate tendency to classify those around them into definite categories, thereby creating a foundation for exclusion. Once these individuals are outside the scope of justice, they are no longer considered to have the right to fair treatment and equality.

== Limitations to existing research ==
Moral exclusion has few critiques, but research on this phenomenon has limitations. Allen-Collinson's 2009 study on research administrations was purely restricted to an academic setting and therefore was a small-scale project that had limitations regarding restricted population range, and diverse roles of the research administrators that were interviewed. These factors made it difficult to find conclusive results regarding research administrators as being negatively marked due to moral exclusion.

Leets' discussion in 2001 regarding moral exclusion and social justice was limited by the restricted population that was being sampled and the possibility for biases occurring within the self-report measures. Specifically, only university students and focus groups were sampled, which could detract from the generalizability of the study. Furthermore, subjects may have responded in a socially desirable fashion when completing the self-report measures that were utilized to determine participants' assessments of a socially sensitive issue.

Tileaga reported that there was not significant research pertaining to the process by which certain groups become discriminated against. He propounded, "The issue of precisely how some particulars groups of people become (or are made) the target of prejudice (extreme prejudice) has been under-explored."

== Dangers ==
Every culture has its own set of values for behavior and communication that exist somewhere along a moral continuum. What constitutes the substance of the continuum may differ by culture, although each culture's continuum has two ends. One pole represents the aforementioned, "scope of justice" and the other pole represents what is considered unjust, cruel or dehumanizing within that culture. The root of exclusion begins with basic categorization. The us/them dichotomy is an embedded psychological process, occurring without conscious thought. As humans we make these distinctions repeatedly. Initially, elevating ingroup and diminishing outgroup may occur in inconsequential ways, as demonstrated by Tajifel's minimal group paradigm. Ordinary behaviors function as dynamic processes that shift cultural norms all the time; for example, American men used to wear top hats as part of everyday dress, but John F. Kennedy changed that. Going hat-less is now a social norm.

However, seemingly benign changes in behavior can function as an entry point for shifting into a system of destruction. People change through their own actions; practicing new habits, seemingly trivial acts, gradually alter both an individual and a collective psyche. For example, at its inception using the salute, "Heil Hitler," was not explicitly harmful to anyone. Yet scholars now perceive adoption of this greeting as a seminal turning point in the most commonly known system of nefarious acts against a group of people. The innocuous becomes insidious. Because individuals hold positions at various levels of corporate and governmental structures, the institutionalization of particular modes of thinking and behaving happens gradually. When individuals in positions of authority adopt customs, they are legitimized. When cultural norms shift toward exclusion of certain groups they can be rationalized; thereby granting legitimization of behavior into the collective consciousness. Ofreneo and de Vela developed a model in 2006 to depict systems of violence situated within a society which are co-created by the social psychological process of moral exclusion, cultural norms that justify violence, and the economic and political hierarchies of power that maintain it. Individuals' psyches function in group norms in three levels of society where moral exclusion roots and recreates itself. At the bottom is the social psychological, within an individual psyche. In the middle of the model is the social cultural, informal group level interaction where behavior is either ignored or applauded which normalizes it or condemned and eradicates it. At the top is the social structure, governments, corporations, and institutions that solidify and reify cultural norms through legislation and policy decisions.

== Examples ==
Moral exclusion includes situations of distinct severity, such as war, genocide, and slavery. Some examples are controversial, like abortion, immigration, and the death penalty. The crux of the matter, invariably, is who has the ability to determine who is worthy of human dignities. In each example, the standard a group or society uses to exclude the other is culturally derived. That is to say, within each culture the criteria for who is cast out is based on particular values. Intercultural differences in the standard exist but are associated with power within that culture.

No setting is immune from marginalizing members. For instance, moral exclusion IS an area of academic study, yet within academia, instances of the phenomena exist. Allen-Collinson in 2009 analyzed moral exclusion among university research administrators. The degradation of research administrators among their academic colleagues is examined and findings indicate that research administrators were being subjected to a dimension of excluding practices; such as, negative labeling and marking. Academic staff had been labeled both informally, and through documentation by their colleagues and administration as "assistant" or "support staff", fundamentally downplaying their skills and expertise. Another dimension of moral exclusion that appeared was the rendering of research administrators as invisible by either excluding them from research related committees as actual academic staff or by not acknowledging their presence in regular staff meetings.

=== Genocide and war ===
Genocide is the act of purposefully exterminating a mass of people because of their identification with a particular group. The most commonly known occurrence of genocide is that of the WWII treatment of Jewish people by the Nazis. Nazis took away fundamental rights of Jewish people by forcing them to relocate out of their homes into camps where they were experimented on, tortured, and killed. Following the war in 1948, a Convention on the Prevention and Punishment of the Crime of Genocide. Genocide is not an outdated relic of war, since 1951 there have been dozens of documented horrific Genocides in history; many continue.

The decades-old conflict between the Palestinians and Israelis stems from moral exclusion. Zionism is an ethno-nationalist ideology predicated on the belief that an extra-territorial population of Jews has a greater claim to the land than Palestinians. While liberal forms of Zionism are not predicated on moral superiority, extreme forms of Zionism, such as Kahanism, operate on the principle of moral exclusion and the belief that Arabs living in Israel are enemies of Israel and must be eliminated. Islamist and Palestinian nationalist organizations such as Hamas have also employed eliminationist rhetoric in reaction to Jewish sovereignty and the Nakba, Naksa, and ethnic cleansing in Gaza.

In the central African states of Rwanda, Burundi and the Democratic Republic of Congo another territorial dispute over resources, land, and ethnic superiority is that of the Tutsi and Hutu peoples. Although a National policy of reconciliation that prohibits discussion of the 1994 genocide and promotes using the national label of "Rwandan," rather than the ethnic categories of the past, civil unrest continues.

=== Slavery ===
Within American history, the forefathers believed that they were morally superior to Africans. Contemporary scholars, such as Michel Foucault, describe this as cultural imperialism. Yet, at the time the forcible kidnapping of Africans from their homes was justified. It was culturally and institutionally sanctioned. Our legal system permitted this practice. European-Americans who enslaved Africans in United States history took away the basic human rights of African slaves in order to have them subject to their orders. Slaves were brutally beaten and treated inhumanely. Even when slavery was abolished, enactments such as the Jim Crow laws kept African-Americans from certain basic rights and access to public space, because some European-Americans believed African-Americans were not worthy of equality to them.

=== Immigrants ===
Another example includes undocumented students, immigrants to the United States, and people who look like immigrants. Regarding undocumented students, this refers to children born in the United States to parents who had illegally entered the U.S. These students are actual U.S. citizens, but have been in danger of exportation or being denied the opportunity to go to school in the United States because they lack appropriate documentation. This is an issue in many states. Particular to Arizona, the state legislature passed a law, Arizona SB 1070, granting police officers the capability to stop anyone they suspect may be illegally in the U.S. and ask them to present their birth certificate. As explored by Mukherjee, Molina, and Adams in 2012, this legislation may be intended to contain illegal immigration, or it may be ethnic categorization as the basis for excluding rights to certain U.S. citizens who do not look like the dominant group. A similar type of moral exclusion is seen in the treatment of people in the city of New York. Individuals can be stopped, questioned, and frisked without cause because they "look suspicious" to police officers in the area. The police officers believe they have the authority to violate these peoples' rights in order to meet certain standards in their respective divisions.

=== Incarceration ===
In the United States every citizen is held to be entitled to basic rights (the right to life, liberty, and the pursuit of happiness). Yet, the justice department has been granted the legitimate power to alter life quality of those in prison. A person in prison is stripped of their freedom, privacy, right to vote; even their right to life if placed under the death penalty. Society has deemed it justifiable to deny incarcerated persons many basic rights and privileges. Since the inmate uprising at Attica in 1971, prison reform has improved conditions, making this 1971 quote from The Nation, seem implausible to have happened in America.

The basic fact that prisoners, too, are human is one that society has yet to accept. "WE are MEN!" the Attica inmates wrote in a manifesto addressed to "the people of America." "We are not beasts and do not intend to be beaten or driven as such." At the top of a list of "demands" was the basic request that officials "provide adequate food, water, and shelter for all inmates." Others included "adequate medical treatment," "realistic, effective rehabilitation programs," "true religious freedom," an end to "censorship of newspapers, magazines [and] letters" and, tellingly, "a program for the recruitment and employment of a significant number of black and Spanish-speaking officers.

=== Capital punishment ===
Capital punishment is a controversial issue. Within the American justice system, the most heinous crimes such as treason, espionage, and murder can incur the death penalty. Those who commit perverse crimes are viewed as unworthy of owning a place within the bounds of the moral community. In this view, egregious criminal activity is paid for by forfeiting the right to live. Making such a judgement precedes and justifies our decision to execute humans. In America everybody believes that murder is wrong; humans should not kill each other, yet people are executed when they do things that place them in an extreme outgroup. Additionally, some believe that life imprisonment is inhumane.

== Solutions and prevention ==
Opotow, Gerson, and Woodside explored moral exclusion theory in terms of teaching peace education and providing a structured and systematic approach to the complex issue of peace. They listed four key social dilemmas that moral exclusion systematically illustrates in the study of conflict, war, and peace: educating for coexistence, educating for human rights, educating for gender equality, and educating for environmentalism. According to them, pairing moral exclusion with these key areas provides a larger scope for and situates peace education as a grave topic warranting study and understanding by students of all ages. Furthermore, Opotow and coauthors asserted that moral exclusion should be seen as a human factor, a capacity of every person, rather than its limited scope as malicious actions of certain aberrant people.

When such conceptualized, the value of mindfully considering habituated behaviors and adopting methods for change is illuminated. Citizens in the scope of the moral community have a responsibility to extend the circle of humanity and effect change through deliberately modifying norms. The aforementioned model of Ofreneo and de Vela explains how justness can be cultivated at each of the three levels of society. At the bottom is the social psychological. Within an individual psyche, individuals can recognize and treat all others with basic human dignity. In the middle of the model is the social cultural. Informal group level interaction, including undesirable labeling, marginalizing, or dehumanizing behavior can be redirected. At the top is the social scaffolding of governments, corporations, and institutions that have the power to redistribute more equitable ideas, thereby solidifying nonviolence as a cultural norm. Norms are social constructions of complex interaction and can be changed through social action, which must occur at each level described.

Dissent is a valuable tool for social change. Choosing not to speak against discriminatory, prejudicial, and marginalizing customs, normalizes and recreates them. Speaking out against inappropriate actions can change them; this can take many forms. For example, telling a friend when language or actions are objectionable because they contribute to the marginalization of others is a simple action with potential larger consequence, although difficult to enact. Participating in more structured forms of dissent may be easier to participate in. Thirteen types of activism described by Roland Watson in 2005 are detailed by @lissnup (Anita Hunt) on her blog, with links to Twitter. Traditional forms of activism include marches, sit-ins, and occupations; such as the then-recent Occupy Wall Street movement. Less traditional forms of activism are becoming more popular. Social media is increasingly used as a tool to propel activism. Music has always been a public forum with the ability to drastically alter culture and carry messages of dissent.

Consequently, when moral exclusion is seen as a human capacity it logically follows that all humans also have the capacity to limit its consequences. As Opotow et al. suggested in 2005, Moral Exclusion Theory can be coupled with peace education to better understand conflict between groups that lead to extreme situations such as genocide and also shift to educating about the importance of an inclusionary focus for groups and individuals.

== See also ==
- Infrahumanisation
- Other (philosophy)
