= Self-justification =

How a person justifies their own beliefs when encountering cognitive dissonance

Self-justification describes how, when a person encounters cognitive dissonance, or a situation in which a person's behavior is inconsistent with their beliefs (hypocrisy), that person tends to justify the behavior and deny any negative feedback associated with the behavior.

== Cognitive dissonance ==
The need to justify our actions and decisions, especially the ones inconsistent with our beliefs, comes from the unpleasant feeling called cognitive dissonance. Cognitive dissonance is a state of tension that occurs whenever a person holds two inconsistent cognitions. For example, "Smoking will shorten my life, and I wish to live for as long as possible," and yet "I smoke three packs a day."

Dissonance is bothersome in any circumstance but it is especially painful when an important element of self-concept is threatened. For instance, if the smoker considered himself a healthy person, this would cause a greater deal of dissonance than if he considered himself an unhealthy person because the dissonant action is in direct conflict with an image of himself. In this case, people who tried to stop smoking but failed, start to think that smoking is not as harmful as they thought.

Dissonance can result from an action dissonant with either a negative or positive concept. For example, Aronson showed that students who failed numerous times at a task showed evidence of dissonance when they later succeeded at the same task. Some even changed correct answers to present a consistent image.

Steele argues that the main cause of dissonance is not necessarily the difference between actions and beliefs, but the resulting degradation of self-image. By not behaving in line with their beliefs, a person may threaten their integrity. One method of reducing dissonance would then be to reaffirm their ‘goodness’. Researchers have shown that this reaffirmation is actually better at reducing dissonant feelings if it is in an unrelated area than a related one. For example, if a smoker is experiencing dissonance because she knows that smoking is bad for her health, she could reduce this dissonance by reminding herself that she is an environmentally friendly person and does a lot of good in reducing her carbon footprint. However, a reminder that she is a healthy person who exercises regularly is actually more likely to increase feelings of dissonance. In support of this idea, research shows that in low-threat situations, people with high self-esteem are less likely to engage in self-justification strategies than those with low self-esteem. It is possible that people with high self-esteem have more accessible positive thoughts about themselves that can successfully reduce dissonance. However, in high-threat situations, these positive thoughts are not enough, and high self-esteem people do engage in self-justification strategies.

== Strategies ==
There are two self-justification strategies: internal self-justification (IS) and external self-justification (ES).

Internal self-justification refers to a change in the way people perceive their actions. It may be an attitude change, trivialization of the negative consequences or denial of the negative consequences. Internal self-justification helps make the negative outcomes more tolerable and is usually elicited by hedonistic dissonance. For example, the smoker may tell himself that smoking is not really that bad for his health.

External self-justification refers to the use of external excuses to justify one's actions. The excuses can be a displacement of personal responsibility, lack of self-control or social pressures. External self-justification aims to diminish one's responsibility for a behavior and is usually elicited by moral dissonance. For example, the smoker might say that he only smokes socially and because other people expect him to.

== Insufficient justification ==
If people have too much external justification for their actions, cognitive dissonance does not occur, and thus, attitude change is unlikely to occur. On the other hand, when people cannot find external justification for their behavior, they must attempt to find internal justification—they reduce dissonance by changing their attitudes or behaviors.

The theory of insufficient justification has many applications in education and child rearing. A study by Aronson & Carlsmith illustrates the results of external rewards in the classroom. They told a classroom full of preschoolers not to play with an attractive toy, threatening half with a mild punishment and half with a severe punishment if they did play with it, and then left the room. None of the children played with the toy. When the researchers came back, they asked the children to rate the attractiveness of the toy. Those who had been threatened with severe punishment still rated it as very attractive; these children had large external justification for not playing with the toy, and so their attitudes had not changed. However, those who had only been threatened with a mild punishment rated the toy as significantly less attractive; without much external justification for not playing with the toy, they had to create internal justifications to reduce their dissonance.

This study can be very useful to parents who use punishment to help teach their children good values. The milder the punishment, the more children must develop internal justification for behaving well. Similarly, if educators want children to internalize their lessons and develop a love of learning, they must help the children find internal justifications for their schoolwork, and minimize external rewards.

Relatedly, the hypocrisy induction (a form of strong internal justification for changing attitudes and behaviors) has been used in recent decades to prevent the spread of HIV/AIDS. The hypocrisy induction is the arousal of dissonance by having individuals make statements that do not align with their own beliefs, and then drawing attention to the inconsistencies between what they advocated and their own behaviors, with the overall goal of leading individuals to more responsible behaviors. In 1991, Aronson and colleagues asked two groups of college students to compose a speech describing the dangers of HIV/AIDS and advocating the use of condoms during every sexual encounter.

One group just composed the arguments; the other also recorded their arguments in front of a video camera that they were told would be seen by an auditorium of high school students. Additionally, half the students in each group were made mindful of their own failings to use condoms. The researchers found that the students who had made the video and thought about their own behaviors (they had the highest level of internal justification and thus the highest dissonance condition) were far more likely to buy condoms afterwards than the students in any other group. Those who only performed a single action, like composing the written arguments, were much more easily able to attribute what they were doing to external justification (i.e.- I’m doing this because the researcher told me to.) Furthermore, they found these results were steady, even several months after the study concluded.

== Moral choices ==
Self-justification often comes into play when discussing why individuals make “immoral” decisions. To keep viewing themselves in a positive light, individuals may rationalize unethical or corrupt decision-making using the aforementioned self-justification strategies.

In a 1958 study on cheating, Mills administered a test to a sixth grade class that was impossible to pass without cheating. Before the test, he measured each student’s attitudes toward cheating. He then gave the 6th graders the test without supervision but with a hidden camera in the classroom. Half of the class cheated and half didn’t. Mills then measured each student’s attitude towards cheating after the test. He found that the students who did cheat developed a more lenient attitude towards cheating while the students who did not cheat developed stronger attitudes against cheating.

In Mills’ study, self-justification occurred. After each student decided whether or not to cheat, they justified this decision to make themselves feel good. To reduce their cognitive dissonance, students who did cheat altered their thoughts on cheating: e.g., “Cheating isn’t that bad,” or “I had to cheat to win the prize,” to justify their actions. On the other hand, students who did not cheat may have justified a lack of success on the test, too: “My morals don't allow me to cheat,” or “Cheating is never right.” In both instances, the student is trying to justify their actions and retain their self-concept.

This experiment shows potential dangers of self-justification. It seems that people who partake in unethical behavior may become slightly more accepting and comfortable with their actions.

== Decision-making: conflict escalation ==
One major claim of social psychology is that we experience cognitive dissonance every time we make a decision; in an attempt to alleviate this, we then submit to a largely unconscious reduction of dissonance by creating new motives of our decision-making that more positively reflect on our self-concept. This process of reducing cognitive dissonance regarding decision-making relates back to the problem of individual becoming stagnant in a course of action. Furthermore, once an individual makes a decision dissonance has begun. To alleviate this dissonance, they rationalize their actions by either changing them—or in this case, continuing in their course of action, perpetuating their qualifying beliefs. In this case, the question concerns the source of the breakdown of rationale that causes the continuation of such disadvantageous behavior.

Prior studies have shown that individuals tend to become locked into a particular course of action, by means of sequential and escalating commitments, resulting in detrimental personal decisions and many other evitable disastrous events. After acknowledging this fundamental attribute of human behavior, it is necessary to understand if these situations arise from concrete decisional errors or are just simply how the events panned out.

There is a large pool of data concerning the justification of behavior in much of the social psychological studies on forced compliance. In these studies the expected result is that individuals bias their attitudes on the experimental task in a positive direction so as to justify previous behavior. In one such study Staw et al. investigated whether decision-makers could become over-committed to a course of action- as is typical following decision related dissonance. The assumption in this particular study was that individuals would go beyond “the passive distortion of adverse consequences in an effort to rationalize a behavioral error.” The consensus among the researchers was also that certain individuals who had experienced setbacks might attempt to “turn the situation around” or in other words display some kind of “ultimate rationality to his or her original course of action.” In the study, the researchers implemented a simulated business case design, in which an administrator could regain loses by committing to new resources. Business school students were asked to fill the role of corporate financial officer and allocate research and development funds to either one of two divisions of a company. In the end, the “findings supported the predication that administrators may seek to justify an ineffective course of action by escalating their commitment of resources to it.” Upon interpreting the findings Staw claims that this, along with several other studies exploring the role of justification in decision-making, subtly highlighted an internal justification process, or in other words an intra-individual process in which people tend to act in ways to protect their own self-image.

Being mindful of escalating commitment to a particular course of action, especially when said actions are failing or having some kind of negative effect on others is very important. This carefulness to avoid the aforementioned behavior can be applied to many aspects of our lives-both in the business world and in more unconventional every day situations. For example, in the Staw study mentioned above, the effects of a growing need for justification was seen in a business workplace setting. In this type of environment it is ideal to make sure that none is continuing on with unfavorable ideas simply because they have rationalized that somehow everything will be successful in the end. Likewise in personal situations involving stocks and investment issues, recognizing when one is only continuing investments out of desperate and misguided hope that things will improve is essential to personal finance and well being. This understanding is not only essential to matters involving finances, but can also be applicable in any situation where a disadvantageous behavior is being perpetuated when clearly it has no merit.
