= Ervin Staub =

Hungarian professor (born 1938)

Ervin Staub (born June 13, 1938) is a professor of psychology, emeritus, at the University of Massachusetts Amherst. He is the founding director of the doctoral program on the psychology of peace and violence. He is most known for his works on helping behavior and altruism, and on the psychology of mass violence and genocide. He was born in Hungary and received his Ph.D. from Stanford. He later taught at Harvard University. He worked in many settings, both conducting research and applying his research and theory. He worked in schools to raise caring and non-violent children, and to promote active bystandership by students in response to bullying, in the Netherlands to improve Dutch-Muslim relations, in Rwanda, Burundi and the Congo to promote healing and reconciliation. He has served as an expert witness, for example, at the Abu Ghraib trials, lectured widely on topics related to his work in academic, public, and government settings in the U.S. and other countries, and is the recipient of numerous honors.

His most recent book is Overcoming evil: Genocide, violent conflict and terrorism. 2011. New York: Oxford University Press.

== Books ==
- Positive social behavior and morality, Vol. 1. Personal and social influences. 1978. Academic Press
- Positive social behavior and morality, Vol. 2. Socialization and development. 1979. Academic Press. (Translated into German).
- Personality: Basic aspects and current research. Edited. 1980. Prentice Hall
- The development and maintenance of prosocial behavior: International perspectives on positive morality. Co-edited, 1984. Plenum
- The roots of evil: The origins of genocide and other group violence. 1989. New York: Cambridge University Press
- Social and moral values: Individual and societal perspectives. Co-edited, 1989. Larry Erlbaum Associates. (Translated into Polish)
- Patriotism in the lives of individuals and nations. Co-edited, 1997. Nelson Hall
- The Psychology of Good and Evil: Why Children, Adults, and Groupts Help and Harm Others. 2003. Cambridge University Press
- Overcoming Evil: Genocide, Violent Conflict, and Terrorism. 2011. Oxford University Press
- The Roots of Goodness and Resistance to Evil, 2015. Oxford University Press
