= Infrahumanisation =

Belief that one's group is more human than other groups

Infrahumanisation (or infrahumanization) is the tacitly held belief that one's ingroup is more human than an outgroup, which is less human. It can also be subjectively defined as a result of group comparison that links with positive in-group bias when the ingroup is seen as fully human in comparison to an out-group that is viewed as lacking humanness. The term was coined by Jacques-Philippe Leyens and colleagues in the early 2000s to distinguish what they argue to be an everyday phenomenon from dehumanisation (denial of humanness) associated with extreme intergroup violence such as genocide. According to Leyens and colleagues, infrahumanisation arises when people view their ingroup and outgroup as essentially different (different in essence) and accordingly reserve the "human essence" for the ingroup and deny it to the outgroup. Dehumanization can happen in two forms. In one form, people see others as less human (subhuman). In another, they see others as not human at all. Both forms are linked to prejudice and discrimination, and they can overlap in real situations, as seen in extreme ideologies such as the Nazi idea of Untermensch.

The belief that the outgroup is less human than the ingroup is seldom consciously endorsed by individuals and instead is reflected in the way people tacitly think about the outgroup. Researchers have typically investigated infrahumanisation by looking at the types of emotions people believe ingroup and outgroup members possess. Some emotions are considered unique to humans (e.g., love, regret, nostalgia), whereas others are viewed as common to both humans and animals (e.g., joy, anger, sadness). In a series of studies, Leyens and colleagues have widely replicated the finding that people attribute uniquely human emotions to the ingroup, but not the outgroup. According to infrahumanisation theory, the denial of uniquely human emotions to the outgroup is reflective of the belief that they are less human than the ingroup.

Recent research has investigated how infrahumanisation influences behaviour. In a series of studies, Jeroen Vaes and his colleagues investigated people's reactions to outgroup members who attempt to "humanise" themselves through the use of uniquely human emotions. They found that ingroup members reacted negatively to outgroup members' attempts to humanise themselves compared to when the same uniquely human emotions were expressed by an ingroup member or when an outgroup member expressed a non-uniquely human emotion, offering less help and withdrawing faster. In an American context, Cuddy and colleagues have investigated the influence of infrahumanisation on intergroup helping behaviour. Examining helping in the aftermath of Hurricane Katrina, Cuddy et al. found that people believed outgroup members experienced less negative uniquely human emotions than ingroup members. The more participants infrahumanised the outgroup member, the less likely they were to help.

However, recent studies have raised concerns about how infrahumanisation studies are designed. Enock et al. (2021) suggest that the emotion words (e.g., guilt and remorse) used in infrahumanisation studies may be failing to distinguish between "uniquely human" and prosociality, which refers to human behaviour that is intended to benefit others. Bunce et al. (2025) found that 95.5% of studies included across the 10 most cited infrahumanisation papers confound humanness and prosociality. The authors argues that many findings previously interpreted as evidence for infrahumanisation may instead reflect ingroup preferences, a tendency to view one's own group more favourably, rather than a specific denial of humanity to outgroups.

== See also ==
- Closure (sociology)
- Dehumanization
