= Brexit withdrawal agreement plan =

UK Government white paper

Legislating for the Withdrawal Agreement between the United Kingdom and the European Union
- Cm 9674
- Created: 24 July 2018
- Location: Palace of Westminster; PDF version
- Author(s): Government of the United Kingdom and Department for Exiting the European Union
- Purpose: To lay out the Governments proposals for ratifying and implementing the Brexit Withdrawal Agreement in domestic legislation.

The Brexit withdrawal agreement Bill plan, officially known as Legislating for the Withdrawal Agreement between the United Kingdom and the European Union (Cm 9674), was a UK Government white paper setting out the Governments proposals for ratifying and implementing the Brexit withdrawal agreement in legislation.

The plan would eventually lead to the European Union (Withdrawal Agreement) Act 2020 which received Royal Assent in January 2020 just before the United Kingdom left the European Union on 31 January 2020.

== See also ==
- 2016 United Kingdom European Union membership referendum
- Brexit
- Brexit plan
- Repeal Bill plan
- Chequers plan
