= Pro-EU leaflet =

2016 UK Government pamphlet

The front cover of the leaflet

"Why the Government Believes That Voting to Remain in the European Union is the Best Decision for the UK" (also known as the pro-EU leaflet, the EU leaflet, or the Brexit leaflet) is a one-off pamphlet created in April 2016 by the government of the United Kingdom. The leaflet was created in anticipation of the United Kingdom European Union membership referendum in June, which would ask the British public whether the UK should leave the EU. After internal polling revealed that 85 per cent of the public wanted more information before making their decision, Prime Minister David Cameron announced that the government would send a leaflet to households across the UK, explaining why remaining in the EU was the best choice for the UK. The leaflets were paid for by British taxpayers at a cost of £9.3 million, and were delivered across the UK in two waves: the first to households in England, and the second to households in Wales, Scotland and Northern Ireland.

The 16-page leaflet warns the British public that Brexit would increase the cost of living in the UK, damage living standards, and lead to "a decade or more of uncertainty". The pamphlet provoked immediate outrage from individuals and organisations that were campaigning to leave. Boris Johnson, Mayor of London, criticised the government for spending taxpayers' money on the leaflet, calling it "crazy" and "a complete waste of money", while Vote Leave, the referendum's official campaign in favour of leaving the EU, accused Cameron of creating the pamphlet to distract media headlines away from his involvement in the Panama Papers scandal.

The Brexit referendum was held on 23 June, with 51.89 per cent of the votes cast being in favour of leaving the EU. After almost four years of negotiations on the terms of departure and on future relations, the UK formally left the EU on 31 January 2020. In February 2019, an analysis of the impact on the British public of exposure to the leaflet concluded that it had led to a decrease of three percentage points in the probability of an individual voting to leave in the referendum.

== Background ==
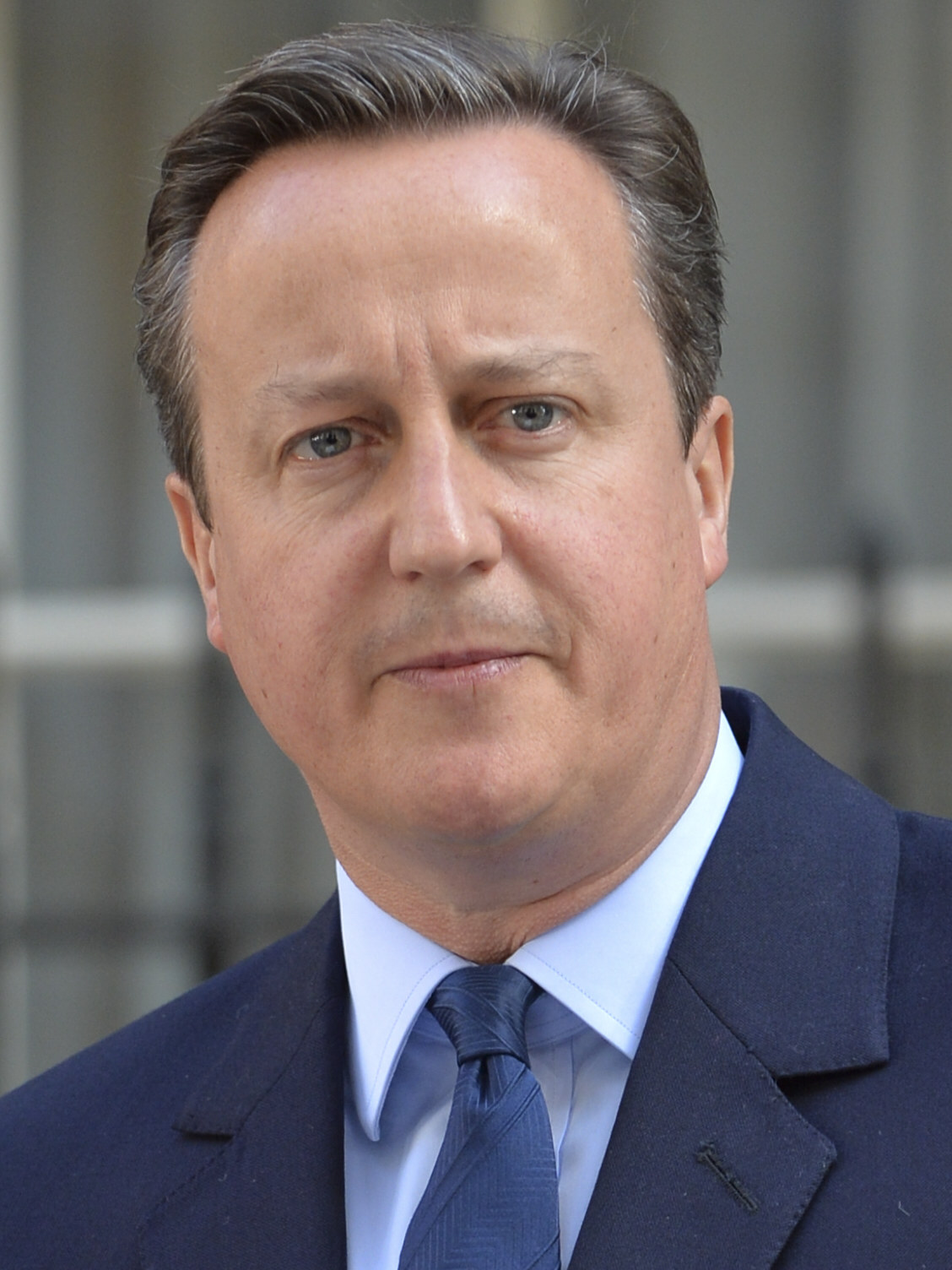
The EU membership referendum was called by Prime Minister David Cameron.

During the Conservative Party's campaign in the 2015 general election, Prime Minister David Cameron pledged in their manifesto to hold a straight in-out referendum on the UK's membership of the EU by the end of 2017. The Conservatives won 330 seats in the House of Commons in May that year, giving them a working majority of 12 seats. Following this, Cameron reiterated his commitment to holding a referendum, which was included in the Queen's Speech on 27 May 2015.

On 20 February 2016, Cameron declared that the referendum would be held on 23 June that year, and that he would be campaigning for Britain to remain. After internal polling revealed that 85% of the British public wanted more information before they made their decision, on 6 April the government announced that it would send a leaflet to households across the UK, explaining why remaining in the EU was the best choice for the UK. Writing in 2019, Harry Pickard of the University of Sheffield summarised the government's motivation by stating: "A clear majority of economists and the UK government had warned that leaving the EU would depress the economy and create a lengthy period of uncertainty, and the Government was keen to convey their stance to voters."

The leaflets were paid for by the British taxpayers at a cost of £9.3 million, of which £458,500 was used for production, £5,947,436 for printing and delivering, and £2,894,064 on the accompanying website and digital promotion. Sent to a total of 27 million households, the leaflets therefore cost 34p per household. The leaflets were printed by the British printing company Williams Lea, and were delivered by Royal Mail in two waves. The first wave was sent to households in England between 11 and 13 April, two to four days before the official regulated ten-week campaigning period began on 15 April. The second wave of leaflets were delivered to households in Wales, Scotland and Northern Ireland after their devolved government elections, in the week beginning 9 May.

The Brexit referendum was held on 23 June, with 51.89% of the votes cast being in favour of leaving the EU. The following day, after the results became known, Cameron announced that he would resign from the office of prime minister. After almost four years of negotiations on the terms of departure and on future relations, the UK formally left the EU at 23:00 GMT on 31 January 2020.

== Contents ==
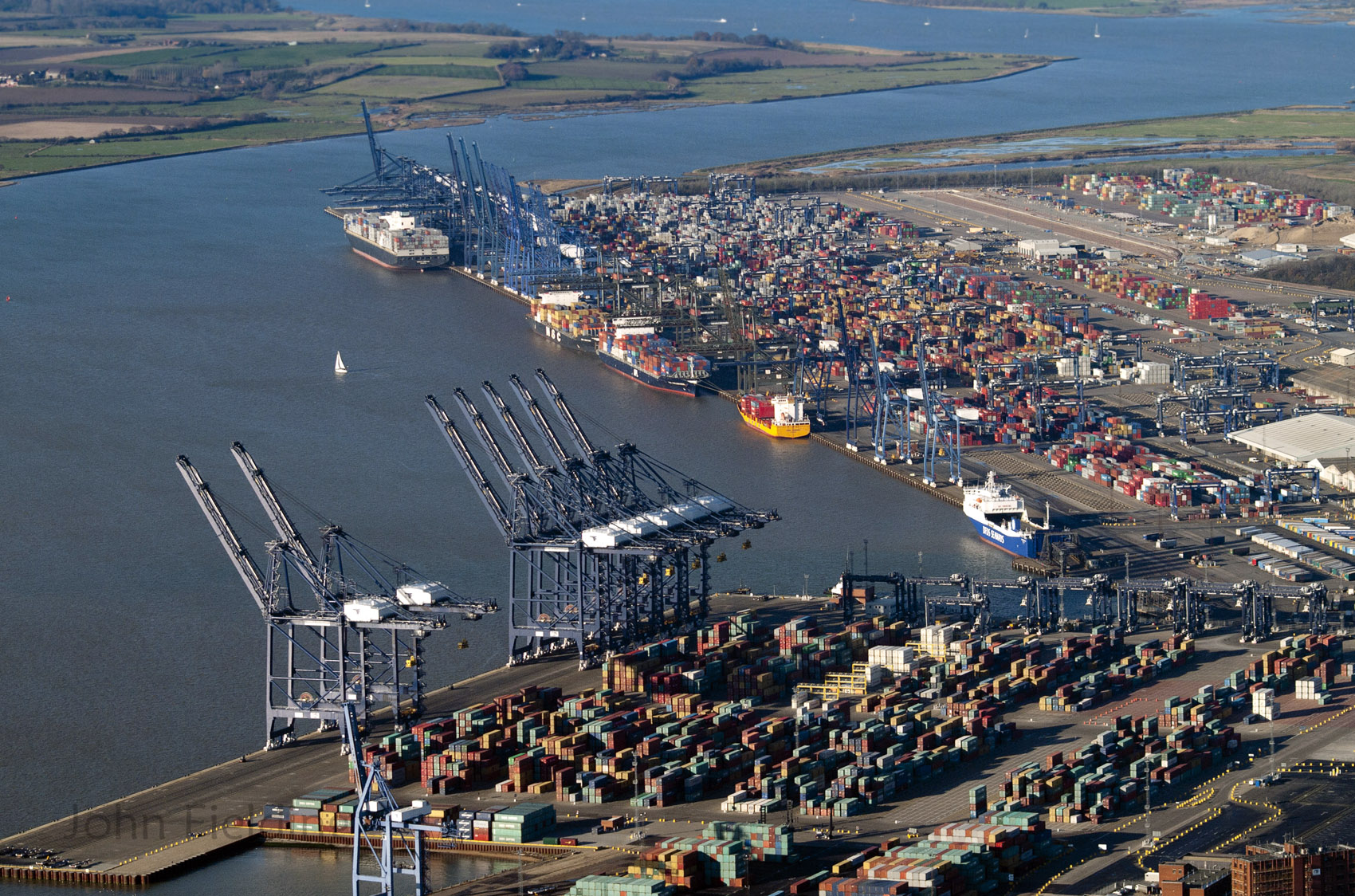
Using a photograph of the Port of Felixstowe similar to the above as illustration, the leaflet argues that "a vote to leave could mean a decade or more of uncertainty".

Including its front and back covers, the leaflet is 16 pages long. Each two-page spread features three columns of text on the left page and a large colour photograph on the right. The pages of the leaflet cover six sections, the first of which details the importance of the Brexit decision, and how it will "affect you, your family and your children for decades to come". The second covers the economic strengths of remaining in the EU—such as the three million jobs "linked to exports to the EU"—and warns that leaving the EU could risk higher unemployment.

The third section lists how EU membership improves British lives. It warns that Brexit would increase the cost of living in the UK, and damage living standards. It also warns that leaving the EU risks higher prices of household goods, and would put pressure on the value of the pound. Reviewing these claims, Andrew Glencross of the University of Stirling said that there were "good reasons" to accept their logic.

The fourth section of the pamphlet lists the uncertainties that Brexit would cause and warns that "a vote to leave could mean a decade or more of uncertainty". Economics journalist Faisal Islam responded to this particular claim by saying "It could, or it could not", as there was "no precedent" for Brexit. This section is illustrated by an image of the Port of Felixstowe, taken by the photographer Mike Page. On learning that his photo had been used without permission, Page—a Eurosceptic—described himself as "livid".

The final two sections of the leaflet detail the risks of that Brexit would bring to controlling immigration and to border security, and the benefits of membership of the EU. Writing for The Conversation, Lindsay Aqui of Queen Mary University of London noted that the section on immigration marked how the debate over Britain's place in Europe had changed since the previous referendum in 1975.

== Reactions ==
News of the government's decision to send households the leaflet was announced on 6 April 2016, and immediately provoked outrage from individuals and organisations who were campaigning to leave. In an interview with ITV News, Mayor of London Boris Johnson criticised the government for spending taxpayers' money on the leaflet, calling it "crazy" and "a complete waste of money", while the Conservative MP Peter Bone similarly called the decision to spend taxpayers' money on the pamphlet "outrageous". Members of the British public who supported Brexit took to Twitter to urge people to deface and return the leaflets to Cameron and the Conservative Party, with the MP Liam Fox saying that he was going to "going to stick [the leaflet] in an envelope addressed to Number 10".

Speaking on behalf of Vote Leave, the referendum's official campaign in favour of leaving the EU, Rob Oxley accused Cameron of creating the leaflet to distract media headlines away from the Panama Papers scandal, which included allegations that he used offshore banking systems. Speaking at a Q&A at the University of Exeter, Cameron defended his decision to produce the leaflet, stating that his government was "not neutral" on the issue, and warned that Brexit would be "bad for our economy, bad for jobs, bad for investment, bad for families' finances". Foreign Secretary Philip Hammond also defended the pamphlet, saying that the government had no intention of undermining the official campaigns of the referendum.

Hours after news of the pamphlet broke, a petition against it—launched on the UK Parliament petitions website on 22 December 2015 by Jayne Adye, director of the Eurosceptic group Get Britain Out—grew significantly in popularity, and had received over 100,000 signatures by 8 April, triggering Parliament to debate the topic on 9 May. The petition was closed on 23 June, the day of the referendum, having ultimately been signed by 221,866 people. As of January 2017, it was the 13th most-signed petition ever on the website.

== Analysis ==
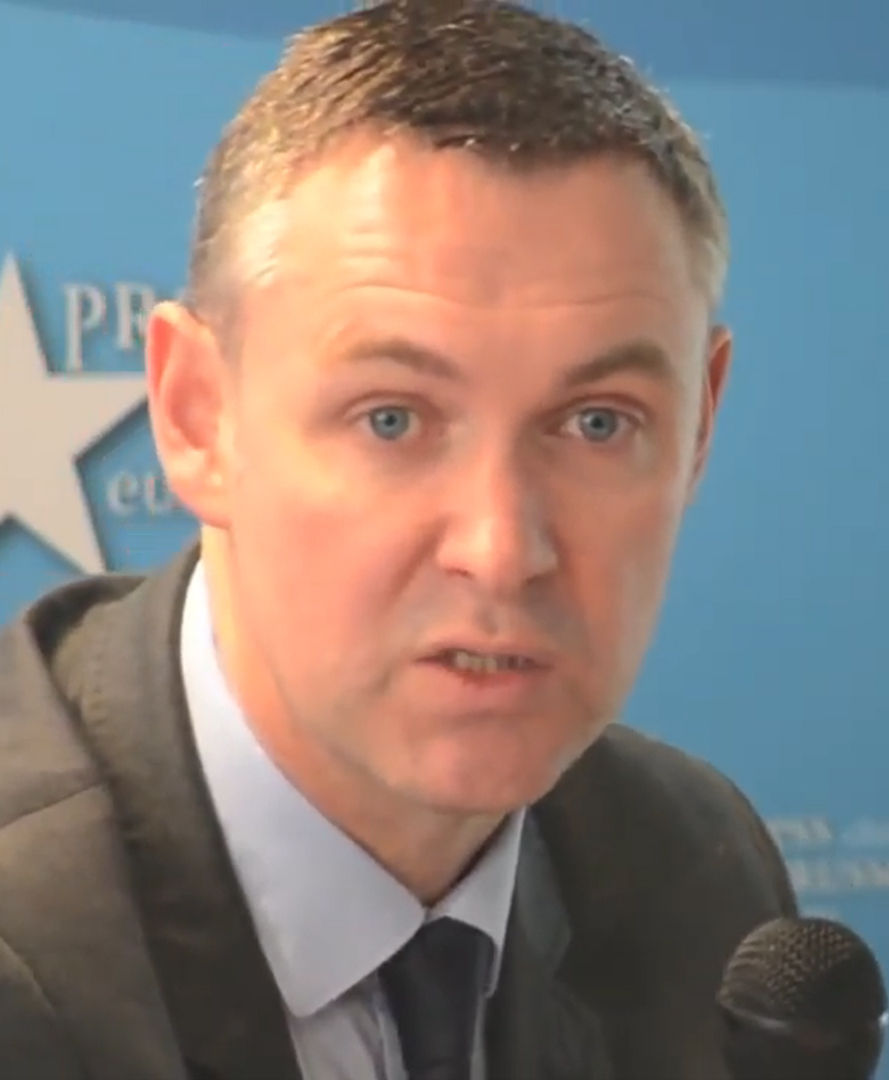
Political scientist Simon Hix described the leaflet as "quite an effective piece of rhetoric".

Analysis of the contents of the leaflet was provided by several independent sources. Anand Menon, director of UK in a Changing Europe—a UK-wide network of researchers and academics—described the leaflet as "factual but partial". Menon explained, for example, that, while it was "probably true" that exports of the EU were linked to more than three million jobs, he did not believe that these jobs would necessarily cease to exist after Brexit. Writing for The Conversation, Glencross felt that it focused exclusively on the benefits of UK–EU cooperation "at an institutional level", and that it did not convey a message about the present-day purpose of integration with Europe. Economics professor Jonathan Portes described the pamphlet as "a mixture of facts, fair points, some dubious assertions and straw men", while political scientist Simon Hix said that, in his opinion, it was "quite an effective piece of rhetoric".

The independent British charity Full Fact performed fifteen fact checks on the leaflet, and concluded that, while it did not attempt to be even-handed, much of the information it contained was accurate. Academic and media commentator Richard G. Whitman felt that the leaflet's contents did not elaborate on issues related to security, despite Cameron's having pushed hard on the argument. Chris Giles of the Financial Times said that the pamphlet was honest in its ambition, and compared its claims favourably to those made by the referendum's official campaigns, Vote Leave and Britain Stronger in Europe. Itemised analyses of the claims in the leaflet were conducted by both BBC News and The Guardian.

== Impact ==
The impact of the leaflet on voting intentions was researched by Harry Pickard of the University of Sheffield and published in 2019. Using a sample of 6,132 individuals from across the UK, Pickard concluded that being exposed to the leaflet led to a three percentage point decrease in the probability of a person's voting to leave in the referendum. This effect was particularly strong among groups that had been exposed to few other sources of information about the referendum, such as women (8.8 percentage points less likely to vote to leave following exposure to the leaflet), those on low incomes (11.4 percentage points), and the risk averse (10.2 percentage points).
