= Brexit plan =

The United Kingdom's exit from and new partnership with the European Union
- Cm 9417
- Created: 2 February 2017
- Location: Palace of Westminster; Online version PDF version
- Author(s): Government of the United Kingdom
- Purpose: To lay out the Brexit negotiation objectives once Article 50 has been triggered and new partnership that the UK proposes to have with the European Union.

The Brexit plan, officially known as The United Kingdom's exit from and new partnership with the European Union (Cm 9417), was a UK Government white paper laying out the approach on the upcoming negotiations the Government was intending to take once Article 50 had been triggered as well as laying out the new partnership once the United Kingdom had left the European Union following the outcome of the 2016 United Kingdom European Union membership referendum and was published on 2 February 2017 by the then Prime Minister, Theresa May on behalf of the UK Government and David Davis, the then Secretary of State for the Department for Exiting the European Union.

The paper was published ahead of the expected United Kingdom invocation of Article 50 which took place at the end of March 2017 and a separate white paper was published outlining the governments proposals to repeal the European Communities Act 1972 and covert EU laws on the British statute book into British law.

== See also ==
- 2016 United Kingdom European Union membership referendum
- Brexit
- Chequers plan
