= Chequers plan =

2018 UK government report on Brexit

The future relationship between the United Kingdom and the European Union
- Cm 9593
- Created: 12 July 2018
- Location: Chequers; Online version PDF version
- Author: Government of the United Kingdom
- Purpose: To lay out the relationship that the UK proposes to have with the European Union after Brexit.

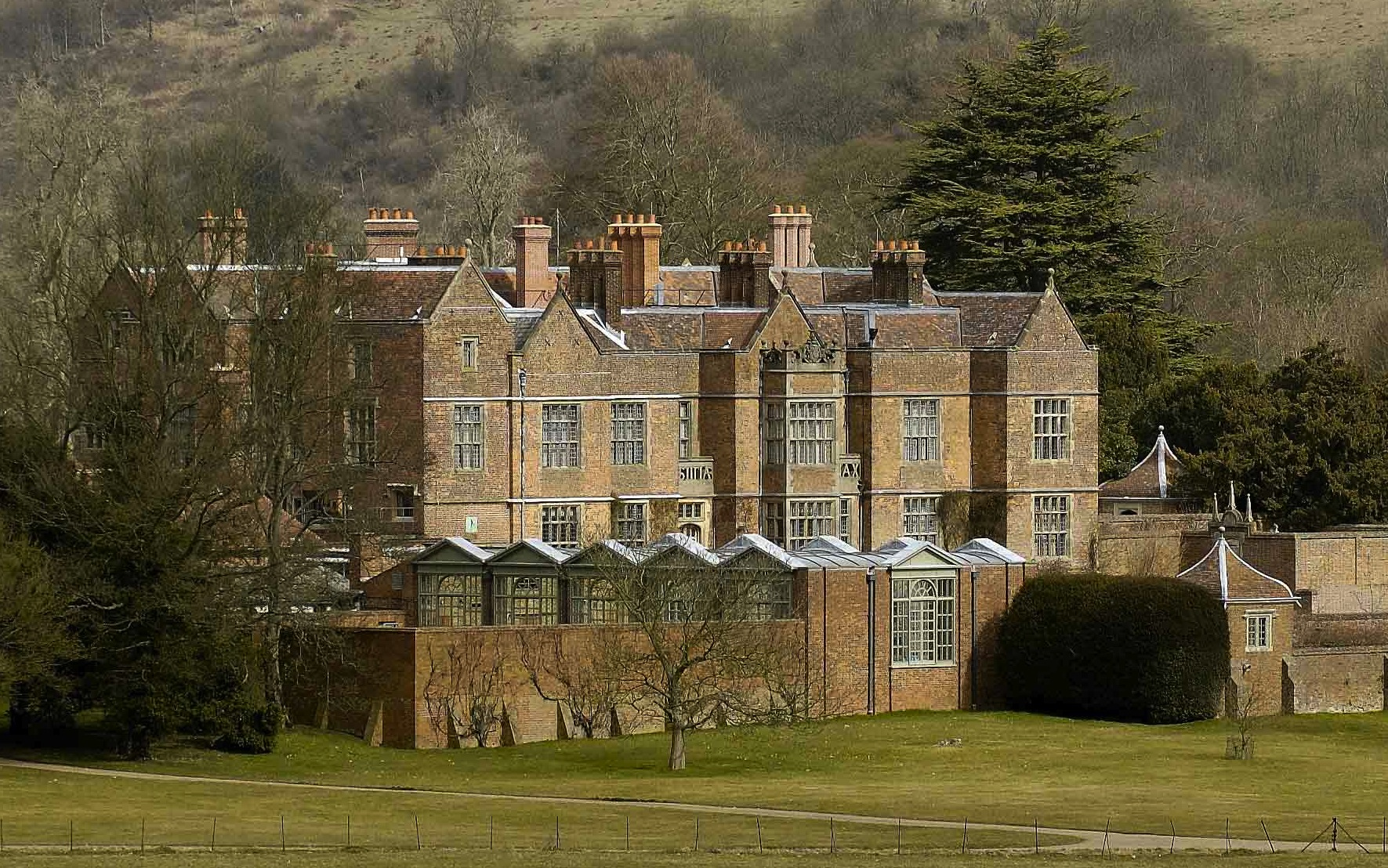
Chequers—the official country residence of the prime minister since 1921—where the Brexit proposals were agreed by the Cabinet

The Chequers plan, officially known as The future relationship between the United Kingdom and the European Union (Cm 9593), was a UK Government white paper concerning Brexit, published on 12 July 2018 by the prime minister, Theresa May. The paper was based on a three-page cabinet agreement from 6 July 2018 and laid out the type of future relationship between the UK and the European Union (EU) that the UK sought to achieve in the Brexit negotiations. At the time it was anticipated that the United Kingdom would leave the European Union on 29 March 2019.

In July 2018, former Secretary of State for Exiting the European Union (Brexit Secretary), Dominic Raab, described it as a "detailed proposal for a principled, pragmatic and ambitious future partnership between the UK and the EU". He also stated that "the white paper proposes a free trade area for goods to maintain frictionless trade, supported by a common rulebook and a new facilitated customs arrangement, but only for the rules that are necessary to provide frictionless trade at the border."

The white paper was finalised at a meeting of the UK Cabinet held at Chequers on 6 July 2018. Brexit Secretary David Davis and Foreign Secretary Boris Johnson resigned in opposition to the plan. The plan was rejected by the EU in September 2018.

== Proposals ==
The white paper was divided into four chapters: economic partnership, security, cooperation and institutional arrangements.

The plan aimed to hold the UK in a close relationship with the EU, stating that the new relationship be "broader in scope than any other that exists between the EU and a third country". This would be done by establishing a new association agreement.

Continued access to the European single market for goods and a common rulebook on state aid would be agreed, preventing either side from subsidising their own industries. For its part, the UK would commit to maintaining high environmental, climate change, social, employment and consumer protection standards.

When presenting the plan, May addressed the Irish border question, stating that there would be no hard border between Northern Ireland and Ireland, and no border in the UK". A "facilitated customs agreement" would remove the need for customs checks by treating the UK and EU "as if a combined customs territory". The UK would apply the EU's tariffs and trade policy on goods intended for the bloc but would control its own tariffs and trade for the domestic market. This differed from a "Canada-plus" deal favoured by the Conservative backbench European Research Group, which would not apply EU tariffs on goods bound for the EU and therefore may threaten such tariffs if countries use lower tariffs in the UK to facilitate tariff-free access with EU countries, undermining EU tariffs; however, it was seen as likely that such a scenario would require a hard border on the island of Ireland as technological solutions to the Irish border questions are not yet available.

== Reactions and resignations ==
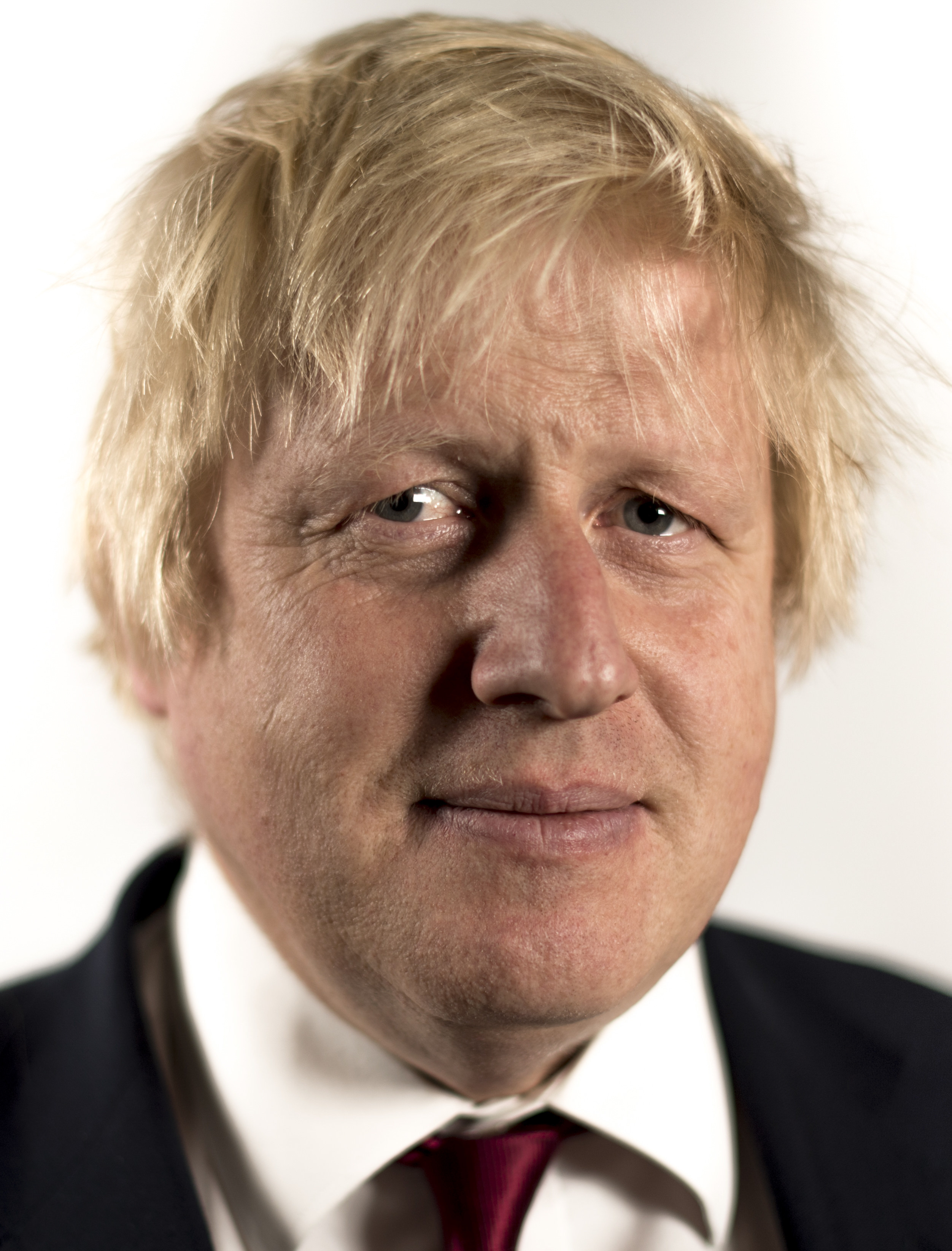
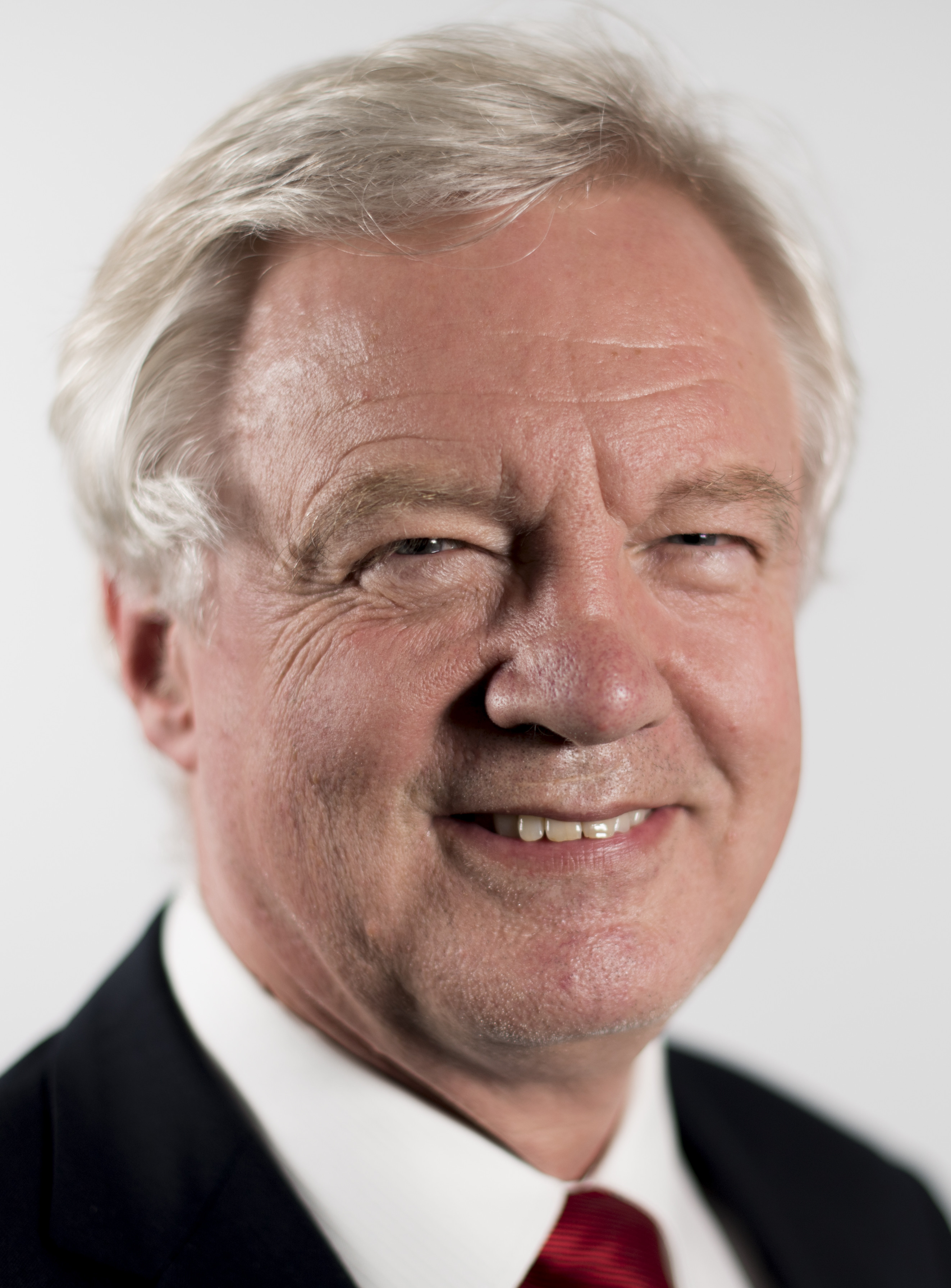
Boris Johnson and David Davis resigned from Cabinet over the Chequers agreement

The proposals gained minimal support from Conservative politicians or leaders of EU member states. In the summer of 2018, May met German Chancellor Angela Merkel as well as French President Emmanuel Macron in order to garner support for the proposals from her French and German counterparts.

May favoured a policy of "managed divergence" from the EU. This policy was explicitly rejected in September 2018, the EU's chief Brexit negotiator, Michel Barnier, said that the integrity of the European Single Market was "not negotiable", and that there can be no "cherry picking" of the market's four freedoms: free movement of people, goods, services and capital. Chequers supported staying in the Single Market for goods, but not the other three freedoms. This had been rejected by the President of the European Council (Donald Tusk) and Barnier before it was in the Chequers deal, as well as on numerous dates from 20 July to 21 September 2018. The EU opposed such divergence as it feared that offering favorable deals to Britain might encourage other member states to follow Britain's example.

Tusk said that the deal was "a step in the right direction", and that there were "positive elements" of the proposal, but added that "the suggested element for economic cooperation will not work, not least because it risks undermining the single market". May, on the other hand, said that Britain needs to see more counter-proposals from the EU.

Davis, Brexit Secretary at the time of the Chequers meeting, resigned over the agreement on 8 July, as did Davis' parliamentary under-secretary, Steve Baker. Foreign Secretary, Boris Johnson followed him the next day. In his resignation speech of 18 July, Johnson said the government allowed "a fog of self-doubt" to fall on its negotiations. The speech received notable attention, and BBC political reporter Laura Kuenssberg said it was "the first Boris Johnson speech that I can remember watching that didn't have any jokes".

== Result of negotiations ==
In November 2018, the Brexit negotiations concluded with a Withdrawal Agreement and a Political Declaration; this included a "commitment to frictionless trade in goods through a common rulebook, the centrepiece of the Chequers plan." The outcome needs support from the UK parliament and the EU leaders. May described the political declaration as "right for the whole of the UK". Leader of the Opposition, Labour Party's Jeremy Corbyn, described the political declaration as "26 pages of waffle". The leaders from the remaining twenty-seven EU countries endorsed the draft.

== See also ==
- Brexit plan
- Canada model
- No-deal Brexit
- Norway-plus model
- People's Vote
- Turkey model
