= 2010s in Europe =

Events from the 2010s decade in Europe

Events from the decade 2010s in Europe.

== International events in Europe ==
The 2010s in Europe saw the rise in nationalist far right populist parties in many nations.

- Sweden: The nationalist Sweden Democrats entered the Swedish parliament for the first time in the 2010 Swedish general election.
- France: The far right obtained representatives in the Assembly for the first time since the 1997 election, The National Rally wins two seats in the 2012 legislative election.
- Germany: The Alternative for Germany (AfD), which was previously unrepresented in the Bundestag, became the third largest party in the Bundestag with 12.6% of the vote in the 2017 German federal election. It was the first time since 1957 that a party to the political right of the CDU/CSU gained seats in the Bundestag.
- Spain: The far-right Vox party entered Congress for the first time in 2019 Spanish general election. Vox's result signalled the first time since Blas Piñar's election as a deputy for the National Union coalition in 1979 that a far-right party had won seats in the Spanish Parliament after the country's return to democracy as well as the first time that a far-right party would be able to form a parliamentary group of its own in the Congress of Deputies.
- Portugal:The right-wing/far-right party CHEGA (CH) elected an MP from Lisbon in the 2019 Portuguese legislative election. It was the first time since the return to democracy 45 years that a right-wing/far-right party gained representation in Parliament.

== History by country ==
=== Albania ===
The 2011 Albanian opposition demonstrations were a series of anti-government protests in cities around Albania following 18 months of political conflict over alleged electoral fraud by the opposition. Demonstrations were called for by parliamentary opposition parties, which include the Socialist Party and the Unity for Human Rights Party. The public outcry resulted in the resignation of the deputy prime minister. On 21 January, a protest in Tirana led to the killings of three demonstrators by the Republican Guard during a rally in front of Prime Minister Sali Berisha office, while fourth person died several days later.

Parliamentary elections were held in Albania on 23 June 2013. The result was a victory for the Alliance for a European Albania led by the Socialist Party and its leader, Edi Rama. Incumbent prime minister Sali Berisha of the Democratic Party-led Alliance for Employment, Prosperity and Integration conceded defeat on 26 June, widely viewed as a sign of growing democratic maturity in Albania.

The 2017 Albanian opposition protests were a series of anti-government protests, largely in Tirana, which centered around government corruption, the illicit drug situation in Albania, fear of electoral fraud in the parliamentary elections, and alleged manipulation of the voting process by the Socialist government. They were followed by the 2019 protests calling for the cancellation of the 2019 Albanian local elections, fresh elections, resignation of prime minister Edi Rama and his entire cabinet and the installation of a new technocrat government.

=== Austria ===
In the 2013 legislative election the Social Democratic Party of Austria and the Austrian People's Party lost 5 seats and 4 seats, respectively, but with a total of 99 seats they remained in majority. On 14 October 2013 the two parties began government formation talks with each other, which resulted in the grand coalition of the Second Faymann government that was appointed by President of Austria Heinz Fischer. On 17 May 2016, it was succeeded by the Kern government, following Faymann's resignation amidst the 2016 presidential election.

The First Kurz government was formed after the 2017 legislative election. Sebastian Kurz, chairman of the centre-right Austrian People's Party, known by its initials in German as ÖVP, reached an agreement on a coalition with the far-right Freedom Party of Austria (FPÖ), setting the stage for Kurz to become chancellor of Austria—the youngest head of government in Europe—for the first time.

The Ibiza affair was a political scandal in Austria involving Heinz-Christian Strache, the former vice chancellor of Austria and leader of the Freedom Party (FPÖ), and Johann Gudenus, a deputy leader of the Freedom Party. The scandal caused the collapse of the Austrian governing coalition on 18 May 2019 and the announcement of an early election.

=== Belarus ===
The 2010 Belarusian protests were mass protest actions in Belarus against the results of the 2010 Belarusian presidential election, which took place on December 19, 2010, and were brutally dispersed. Between 10,000 and 60,000 people took part in the protest on October Square and Independence Square in Minsk. These were followed by the 2011 Belarusian protests. The 2017 Belarusian protests also followed later.

=== Belgium ===
Following the Belgian general election held on 13 June 2010, a process of cabinet formation started in Belgium. The election produced a very fragmented political landscape, with 11 parties elected to the Chamber of Representatives, none of which won more than 20% of the seats. The Flemish-Nationalist New Flemish Alliance (N-VA), the largest party in Flanders and the country as a whole, controlled 27 of 150 seats in the lower chamber. The Francophone Socialist Party (PS), the largest in Wallonia, controlled 26 seats. Cabinet negotiations continued for a long time. On 1 June 2011, Belgium matched the record for time taken to form a new democratic government after an election, at 353 days, held until then by Cambodia in 2003–2004.

On 11 October 2011, the final agreement for institutional reform was presented to the media. A government coalition was named on 5 December 2011 and sworn in after a total of 541 days of negotiations and formation on 6 December 2011, and 589 days without an elected government with Elio Di Rupo named Prime Minister of the Di Rupo I Government. It was the first time that the Belgian prime minister had been openly gay, as Di Rupo became the world's first male openly gay head of government (and second of any gender, after Iceland's Jóhanna Sigurðardóttir). Elio Di Rupo also became the first native French-speaking prime minister since 1979 and the first prime minister from Wallonia since 1974 and first socialist prime minister since 1974.

The Michel I Government was the Federal Government of Belgium formed following the 2014 Belgian government formation and sworn in on 11 October 2014. The administration was a centre-right coalition of the New Flemish Alliance (N-VA), the Christian Democratic and Flemish (CD&V), the Open Flemish Liberals and Democrats (Open Vld) and the Reformist Movement (MR). The prime minister was Charles Michel. The government had an agenda of socio-economic reforms, especially through austerity measures, with its priorities being improving Belgium's economic competitiveness and reducing unemployment. It fell in December 2018 over the Global Compact for Migration. It was followed by the Michel II Government as a centre minority coalition cabinet of Christian Democratic and Flemish (CD&V), the Open Flemish Liberals and Democrats (Open Vld) and the Reformist Movement (MR). On 26 October 2019, it was announced that Sophie Wilmès would take over the role of prime minister from Michel on 1 November 2019, and form a new government as the first ever female prime minister of Belgium.

==== Premierships ====
Charles Michel (French: [ʃaʁl(ə) miʃɛl]; born 21 December 1975) is a Belgian politician who served as the president of the European Council from 2019 to 2024. He previously served as the prime minister of Belgium between 2014 and 2019. Michel became the minister of development cooperation in 2007 at age thirty-one, and remained in this position until elected the leader of the Francophone liberal Reformist Movement (MR) in February 2011. He led MR to the 2014 federal election, where they emerged as the third-largest party in the Chamber of Representatives. After coalition negotiations, Michel was confirmed as prime minister of an MR-N-VA-OVLD-CD&V government. He was sworn in on 11 October 2014, becoming the youngest Belgian prime minister since Jean-Baptiste Nothomb in 1841.

In December 2018, the government collapsed following internal disagreements over the handling of the Global Compact for Migration, with the N-VA withdrawing from the cabinet. Michel subsequently tendered his resignation and remained in office in a caretaker capacity. At the 2019 federal election shortly afterwards, MR lost a number of seats, although Michel remained in office as interim prime minister during coalition negotiations. Weeks after the federal election, on 2 July 2019, the European Council voted to appoint Michel as its new president. He took over from Donald Tusk at a ceremony on 29 November 2019, formally beginning his term on 1 December 2019. In January 2024, he announced he would step down as president of the European Council to run in the 2024 European Parliament election, before reversing his decision within the same month and declaring he would finish his current mandate.

Despite three parties (all but N-VA) having been part of the preceding Di Rupo Government as well, the programme of this coalition differs substantially from the previous one. The emphasis is on socio-economic reforms, especially through austerity measures. Important goals for the parties include helping businesses become more competitive, and increasing job growth.

The announced measures were met by protests primarily from the labour unions, which argued that the measures favour employers and disproportionately burden employees and families. The unions, ACV/CSC, ABVV/FGTB and ACLVB/CGSLB, which play an important and institutionalised role in Belgium's political process, did not accept the government's offer for dialogue, maintaining that the government was not seriously inclined to reconsider any of the measures. Instead, the unions organised several regional and national strikes in November and December 2014, culminating in a one-day general strike on 15 December.

One of the federal executive's flagship measures was tax reform, or tax shift, aimed, among other things, at reducing the cost of labour. It took effect on 1 January 2016.

Following the 22 March 2016 attacks in Brussels, Interior Minister Jan Jambon and Justice Minister Koen Geens submitted their resignations. They were refused by the Prime Minister.

Another reform of the executive consists of increasing the age of retirement. It will thus increase from 65 to 66 in 2025 and from 66 to 67 in 2030 in order to finance the future cost of pensions. This measure, strongly criticized by the unions, provoked numerous strikes and demonstrations.

An often recurring subject was whether or not a capital gains tax should be introduced, together with a general tax reform. In the summer of 2017, the corporate gains tax was announced to be reduced from 33.99% to 29% starting 2018 and further down to 25% from 2020 whereas a capital gains tax of 0.15% on gains on financial securities was introduced for wealthier citizens holding accounts of at least 0.5 million Eur in value. Meanwhile the first 627 Eur of income through dividends became tax exempt.

Other measures taken by the government include the purchase of F-35s to replace the Belgian army's F-16s, the abandonment of nuclear power by 2025, the removal of abortion from the penal code and the launch of a public investment pact in cooperation with the private sector.

The government presided over the arrest of suspects who were accused of playing a role in the Paris attacks of November 2015, as well as a terrorist attack in Brussels in March 2016.

In December 2018, a political crisis emerged over whether to sign the Global Compact for Migration; N-VA was against whereas the other three parties supported it. On 4 December the Prime Minister of Belgium, Charles Michel, announced that the issue would be taken to parliament for a vote. On 5 December, parliament voted 106 to 36 in favor of backing the agreement. Michel stated that he would endorse the pact on behalf of the parliament, not on behalf of the divided government. Consequently, N-VA quit the government; the other three parties continue as a minority government (Michel II).

On 18 December 2018, Michel submitted the cabinet's resignation to the King, who accepted it on 21 December.

=== Bosnia and Herzegovina ===
Following the general election on 3 October 2010, a process of formation of Bosnia and Herzegovina's Council of Ministers had begun. The resulting election produced a fragmented political landscape without a coalition of a parliamentary majority more than a year after the election. The centre-left Social Democratic Party, the largest party in the Federation of Bosnia and Herzegovina, and the Bosnian Serb autonomist Alliance of Independent Social Democrats, the largest party in Republika Srpska, each had 8 MPs of the total 42 MPs of the House of Representatives (28 from the Federation and 14 from Republika Srpska). Similarly, a crisis of government was also present at the local levels, as well as the Federal entity. In late 2011, the Council of Ministers (i.e. the national government) had been solved, however the country remained in a situation of perpetual political crisis, especially the Federation of Bosnia and Herzegovina. After months of dysfunction and arguments about legality, the entity's short-lived Federal Government had collapsed in February 2013.

The 2014 unrest in Bosnia and Herzegovina was a series of demonstrations and riots that began in the northern town of Tuzla on 4 February 2014 but quickly spread to multiple cities in Bosnia and Herzegovina, including Sarajevo, Zenica, Mostar, Jajce, and Brčko, among others, for social reasons and with the aim of overthrowing the government. The riots were the most violent scenes the country had seen since the end of the Bosnian War in 1995. The rioting largely took place in the entity of Federation of Bosnia and Herzegovina, and the same level of unrest or activism did not occur in Republika Srpska.

=== Bulgaria ===
Following the 2013 Bulgarian protests against the Borisov cabinet of Prime Minister Boyko Borisov over government austerity measures encouraged by the European Union and the International Monetary Fund during the recession and high utility bills, the Borisov government resigned and brought forward the Bulgarian parliamentary election, 2013, which saw a very low voter turnout. Though Borisov's party Citizens for European Development of Bulgaria (GERB) won a plurality with 97 deputies in the National Assembly, it could not form a government and gave up its mandate. The Bulgarian Socialist Party (BSP) led the government under technocratic prime minister Plamen Oresharski. The left-wing government of Plamen Oresharski was approved by the 120 members of the BSP and the Movement for Rights and Freedoms. Outside support to the Oresharski Government was also given by nationalist party Ataka, dubbed by some sources as the "hidden coalition partner", or Siderov's "golden finger", and regarded as a key instrument for allowing the Parliament to proceed with its functions, until June 2014.

=== Croatia ===
Croatia finished accession (membership) negotiations on 30 June 2011 and signed the Treaty of Accession on 9 December 2011, setting it on course to become the bloc's 28th member state. A referendum on the EU accession of the Republic of Croatia was held on 22 January 2012. The EU accession referendum passed with 66.27% votes cast in support, 33.13% against the proposed joining of the EU and 0.60% invalid or blank votes; it also passed in all Croatian counties. The ratification process was concluded on 21 June 2013, and entry into force and accession of Croatia to the EU took place on 1 July 2013.

=== France ===
==== Presidents ====
François Gérard Georges Nicolas Hollande (French: [fʁɑ̃swa ʒeʁaʁ ʒɔʁʒ(ə) nikɔla ɔlɑ̃d]; born 12 August 1954) is a French politician who served as President of France from 2012 to 2017. Before his presidency, he was First Secretary of the Socialist Party (PS) from 1997 to 2008, Mayor of Tulle from 2001 to 2008, as well as President of the General Council of Corrèze from 2008 to 2012. He has also held the 1st constituency of Corrèze seat in the National Assembly three times, first from 1988 to 1993, then from 1997 to 2012, and from 2024 onwards.

Born in Rouen and raised in the Parisian suburb of Neuilly-sur-Seine, Hollande began his political career as a special advisor to newly-elected President François Mitterrand before serving as a staffer for Max Gallo, the government's spokesman. He became a member of the National Assembly in 1988 and was elected First Secretary of the PS in 1997. Following the 2004 regional elections won by the PS, Hollande was cited as a potential presidential candidate, but he resigned as First Secretary and was immediately elected to replace Jean-Pierre Dupont as President of the General Council of Corrèze in 2008. In 2011, Hollande announced that he would be a candidate in the primary election to select the PS presidential nominee; he won the nomination against Martine Aubry before he was elected to the presidency (becoming also, ex officio, Co-Prince of Andorra) on 6 May 2012 in the second round with 51.6% of the vote, defeating incumbent Nicolas Sarkozy.

During his tenure, Hollande legalised same-sex marriage by passing Bill no. 344, reformed labour laws and credit training programmes, signed a law restricting the cumul des mandats, and withdrew French forces in Afghanistan, in addition to concluding an EU directive on the protection of animals in laboratory research through a Franco-German contract. Hollande led the country through the January and November 2015 Paris attacks, as well as the 2016 Nice attack. He was a leading proponent of EU mandatory migrant quotas and NATO's 2011 military intervention in Libya. He also sent troops to Mali and the Central African Republic with the approval of the UN Security Council in order to stabilise those countries, two operations however largely seen as failures. He drew controversy among his left-wing electoral base for supporting the Saudi Arabian-led intervention in Yemen.

Under Hollande's presidency, Paris hosted the 2015 United Nations Climate Change Conference, and his efforts to bring the 2024 Summer Olympics to the city were successful. However, with domestic troubles – in particular due to Islamic terrorism – over the course of his tenure, and unemployment rising to 10%, he faced spikes and downturns in approval rates, ultimately making him the most unpopular head of state under the Fifth Republic. On 1 December 2016, he announced he would not seek reelection in the 2017 presidential election, for which polls suggested his defeat in the first round.

Emmanuel Jean-Michel Frédéric Macron (Note: US: /ɪˈmænju.ɛl məkˈroʊn/; French: [emanɥɛl makʁɔ̃]) (born 21 December 1977) is a French politician who has served as President of France since 2017. He has been a member of Renaissance since founding the party in 2016. Macron previously served as Deputy Secretary-General to the President from 2012 to 2014 and Minister of Economics and Finance from 2014 to 2016 under President François Hollande.

Born in Amiens, Macron studied philosophy at Paris Nanterre University. He completed a master's degree in public affairs at Sciences Po and graduated from the École nationale d'administration in 2004. He worked as a senior civil servant at the General Inspectorate of Finance and as an investment banker at Rothschild & Co. Macron was a senior adviser to President Hollande, being appointed as Élysée deputy secretary-general by Hollande after the 2012 presidential election. He was later appointed as Economics Minister in 2014 in the second Valls government, and led several business-friendly reforms. He resigned in 2016 to launch his 2017 presidential campaign. A member of the Socialist Party between 2006 and 2009, he ran in the election under the banner of En Marche, a centrist and pro-European political movement which he founded in 2016.

Partly due to the Fillon affair, Macron was elected president in May 2017 with 66% of the second-round vote, defeating Marine Le Pen of the National Front. Aged 39, he became the youngest president in French history. In the 2017 legislative election, his party, renamed La République En Marche! (LREM), secured a majority in the National Assembly. During his presidency, Macron has overseen reforms to labour laws, taxation, and pensions; and pursued a renewable energy transition. Dubbed "president of the rich" by opponents, increasing protests against his reforms culminated in 2018–2020 with the yellow vests protests and the pension reform strike. From 2020, he led France's response to the COVID-19 pandemic and subsequent recession, including by overseeing the country's vaccination rollout. In foreign policy, Macron called for reforms to the European Union (EU) and signed treaties with Germany and Italy. He conducted €40 billion in trade and business agreements with China during the China–United States trade war and oversaw a dispute with Australia and the US over the AUKUS security pact. Macron has also continued Opération Chammal in the war against the Islamic State and joined in the international condemnation of the Russian invasion of Ukraine.

Macron was elected to a second term in the 2022 presidential election, again defeating Le Pen and becoming the first French presidential candidate to win reelection since Jacques Chirac in 2002. In the 2022 legislative election, Macron's centrist coalition lost its majority, resulting in a hung parliament and formation of France's first minority government since 1993. In 2023, the government of his prime minister, Élisabeth Borne, passed legislation raising the retirement age from 62 to 64; this led to public sector strikes and violent protests. In 2024, Macron appointed Gabriel Attal as prime minister after a government crisis. He then dissolved the National Assembly and called a snap legislative election following overwhelming defeat at the 2024 European Parliament elections, which resulted in another hung parliament and an electoral defeat for his coalition. Afterwards, Macron appointed Michel Barnier, a conservative and former chief Brexit negotiator, as prime minister. Three months in, Barnier was toppled by a historic vote of no confidence, prompting Macron to replace him with centrist veteran François Bayrou. After Bayrou was himself brought down by a confidence vote in September 2025, Macron appointed Sébastien Lecornu, Minister of the Armed Forces, as prime minister. Lecornu resigned less than a month later following political backlash over the composition of his government, but was reappointed by Macron shortly afterwards. The formations of these short-lived governments marked a political crisis.

=== Germany ===
==== Chancellors ====
Angela Dorothea Merkel (Note: German pronunciation: [aŋˈɡeːla doʁoˈteːa ˈmɛʁkl̩]) (Note: The English pronunciation of her first name could be /ˈɑːŋɡələ/ AHNG-gə-lə (a closer approximation of the German) or /ˈæŋɡələ/ ANG-gə-lə. The English pronunciation of her last name is either /ˈmɛərkəl/ MAIR-kəl (reported for American English and a closer approximation of the German) or /ˈmɜːrkəl/ MUR-kəl (reported for British English by the Oxford and Merriam-Webster dictionaries, which base their editing on actual usage rather than recommendations). In German, her last name is pronounced [ˈmɛʁkl̩], and her first name is pronounced [ˈaŋɡela] or [aŋˈɡeːla], but according to her biographer Langguth, Merkel prefers the latter pronunciation, with stress on the second syllable.) (née Kasner; born 17 July 1954) is a German stateswoman and retired politician who served as Chancellor of Germany from 2005 to 2021. She is the only woman and only former East German to have held the office. She was Leader of the Opposition from 2002 to 2005 and Leader of the Christian Democratic Union (CDU) from 2000 to 2018.

Merkel was born in Hamburg in West Germany. Her family moved to East Germany when she was an infant. A member of the communist East German Free German Youth (FDJ), Merkel obtained a doctorate in quantum chemistry in 1986 and worked as a research scientist until 1989. She then entered politics in the wake of the Revolutions of 1989, briefly serving as deputy spokeswoman for the first democratically elected government of East Germany, led by Lothar de Maizière. Following German reunification in 1990, Merkel was elected to the Bundestag for the state of Mecklenburg-Vorpommern. As the protégée of Chancellor Helmut Kohl, Merkel was appointed as Minister for Women and Youth in 1991, later becoming Minister for the Environment, Nature Conservation and Nuclear Safety in 1994. After the CDU lost the 1998 federal election, Merkel was elected general secretary of the party. She then became the party's first female leader, and the first female leader of the Opposition, two years later.

Following the 2005 federal election, Merkel was elected chancellor, leading a grand coalition consisting of the CDU, the Christian Social Union (CSU), and the Social Democratic Party of Germany (SPD). She was the first woman to be elected chancellor, and the first chancellor of the reunified Germany to have been raised in the former East Germany. (Note: This is significant in so far as East Germany has remained economically and socially disadvantaged post-reunification. See also Economic history of the German reunification and New states of Germany.) In the 2009 federal election, the CDU obtained the largest share of the vote, and Merkel subsequently formed a coalition government with the Free Democratic Party (FDP), an alliance more favourable to the CDU than the grand coalition. In the 2013 federal election, the CDU won a landslide victory and formed a second grand coalition with the SPD, after the FDP lost all of its representation in the Bundestag. In the 2017 federal election, Merkel led the CDU to become the largest party for the fourth time, resulting in the formation of a third grand coalition with the SPD.

In foreign policy, Merkel emphasised international cooperation, both in the context of the EU and NATO, and initiating the Russian reset and strengthening of Eurasian and transatlantic economic relations. In the first half of 2007, Merkel served as president of the European Council and played a central role in the negotiation of the Treaty of Lisbon and the Berlin Declaration. Merkel's governments managed the 2008 financial crisis and the Euro area crisis. She negotiated the 2008 European Union stimulus plan, which focused on infrastructure spending and public investment to counteract the Great Recession. Also in 2008, she actively blocked the access of Ukraine and Georgia in the enlargement of NATO during the 2008 Bucharest summit.

In domestic policy, Merkel's Energiewende programme supported the development of renewable energy sources and eventually phased out the use of nuclear power in Germany. Despite the 2014 Russian annexation of Crimea, which prompted sanctions around the world, she initiated the construction of the controversial Nord Stream 2 pipelines to Russia and protected their construction from United States sanctions imposed in 2019. Reforms to the Bundeswehr, health care reform, the 2010s European migrant crisis, and the COVID-19 pandemic were major issues during her chancellorship. Merkel stepped down as leader of the CDU in 2018 and did not seek a fifth term as chancellor in the 2021 federal election. Following the 2022 Russian invasion of Ukraine, her legacy came under increased scrutiny both in Germany and abroad for her relatively good relations with Russia and increasing the German economy's dependence on Russia, as well as the downsizing of the Bundeswehr that occurred during her tenure.

=== Hungary ===
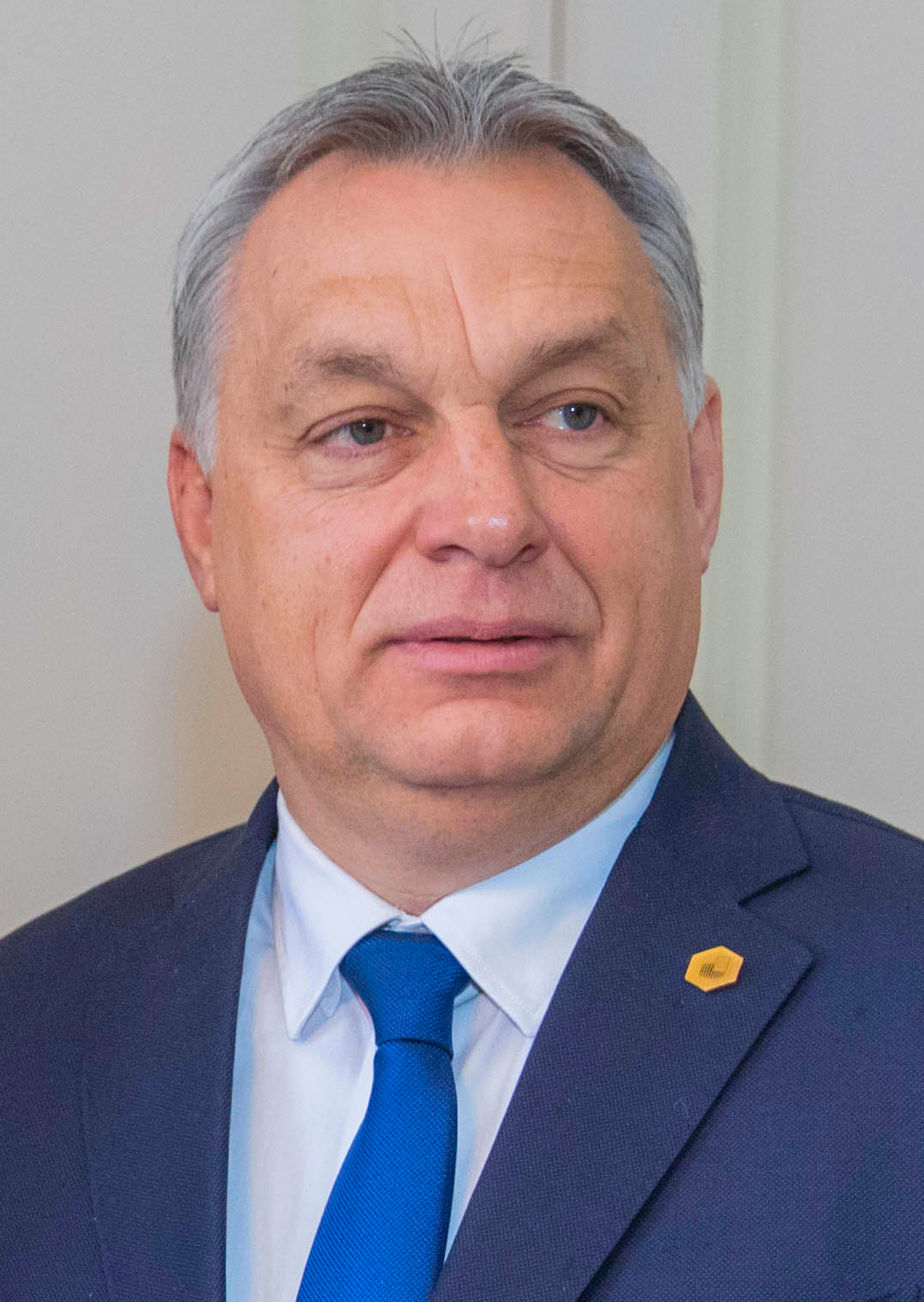
Hungarian prime minister Viktor Orbán

The Őszöd speech which was followed by mass protests led Fidesz to winning a supermajority in the 2010 election. In 2011, the new Hungarian constitution was adopted in the parliament and in 2012 it became effective, although it was subject to controversies due to its consolidation of power to Fidesz. The party's majority of seats remained after the 2014 election, and following the escalation of the migrant crisis, Fidesz began using right-wing populist and anti-immigrant rhetoric. Fidesz won again in the 2018 election.

Because of Orbán's curtailing of press freedom, erosion of judicial independence and undermining of multiparty democracy, many political scientists and watchdogs consider Hungary to have experienced democratic backsliding during Orbán's tenure. Orbán's attacks on the European Union while accepting its money and funneling it to his allies and family have also led to characterizations of his government as a kleptocracy. Orbán defends his policies as "illiberal democracy."

During the 2015 European migrant crisis the Orban Hungarian government initiated the erection of the Hungary-Serbia barrier to block entry of illegal immigrants.

Hungary held a 2016 Hungarian migrant quota referendum, an overwhelming majority of voters rejected the EU's migrant quotas.

=== Italy ===
The 2013 Italian general election led to a major change in the country's political landscape, as the traditional center-right and center-left parties were challenged by the new Five Star Movement, a populist party led by comedian Beppe Grillo. None of the three main alliances – the centre-right led by Silvio Berlusconi, the centre-left led by Pier Luigi Bersani and the Five Star Movement – won an outright majority in Parliament. After a failed attempt to form a government by Bersani, then-secretary of the Democratic Party (PD), and Giorgio Napolitano's re-election as President, Enrico Letta, Bersani's deputy, received the task of forming a grand coalition government. The Letta Cabinet consisted of the PD, Berlusconi's The People of Freedom (PdL), Civic Choice (SC), the Union of the Centre (UdC) and others.

Following the election of Matteo Renzi as Secretary of the PD in December 2013, there were persistent tensions culminating in Letta's resignation as prime minister in February 2014. Subsequently, Renzi formed a government based on the same coalition (including the NCD), but in a new fashion. The new prime minister had a strong mandate from his party and was reinforced by the PD's strong showing in the 2014 European Parliament election and the election of Sergio Mattarella, a fellow Democrat, as president in 2015. While in power, Renzi implemented several reforms, including a new electoral law (which would later be declared partially unconstitutional by the Constitutional Court), a relaxation of labour and employment laws (known as Jobs Act) with the intention of boosting economic growth, a thorough reform of the public administration, the simplification of the civil trial, the recognition of same-sex unions (not marriages) and the abolition of several minor taxes. As a result of the Libyan civil war, a major problem faced by Renzi was the high level of illegal immigration to Italy. During his tenure, there was an increase in the number of immigrants rescued at sea being brought to southern Italian ports, prompting criticism from the M5S, FI and Northern League (LN), and causing a loss of popularity for Renzi.

In the 2018 Italian general election, no political group or party won an outright majority, resulting in a hung parliament. In the election, the right-wing alliance, in which Matteo Salvini's League (LN) emerged as the main political force, won a plurality of seats in the Chamber of Deputies and in the Senate, while the anti-establishment Five Star Movement (M5S) led by Luigi Di Maio became the party with the largest number of votes. The centre-left coalition, led by Matteo Renzi, came third. As a result, protracted negotiations were required before a new government could be formed. On 31 May 2018, following 88 days of negotiations and several impasses, law professor Giuseppe Conte was appointed as the prime minister with support from the League and the Five Star Movement, even though not having run for the Italian Parliament. Matteo Salvini of the League and Luigi Di Maio of the Five Star Movement were also appointed as vice premiers, thus forming the 66th Italian government since World War II. The formation of a new government avoided the possibility of immediate new elections. The coalition government was formed between the Lega Nord and Five Star Movement, becoming the first fully populist government in Western Europe.

During the 2019 Italian government crisis, Deputy Prime Minister Salvini announced a motion of no confidence against Conte, after growing tensions within the majority. Salvini's move came right after a vote in the Senate regarding the progress of the Turin–Lyon high-speed railway, in which the Lega voted against an attempt of the M5S to block the construction works. Many political analysts believe the no confidence motion was an attempt to force early elections to improve Lega's standing in Parliament, ensuring Salvini could become the next prime minister. On 20 August, following the parliamentary debate in which Conte harshly accused Salvini of being a political opportunist who "had triggered the political crisis only to serve his personal interest", the prime minister resigned his post to President Sergio Mattarella. This provoked the resignation of Prime Minister Giuseppe Conte, and resulted in the formation of a new cabinet led by Conte himself.

=== Russia ===
Russia re-elected Vladimir Putin as the president in 2012 Russian presidential election. The election was marred by claims of fraud, contributing to the 2011–2013 Russian protests. Under Putin, Russia engaged in a more aggressive foreign policy, with the 2014 Annexation of Crimea and intervention in Ukraine following the 2014 Ukrainian revolution, the 2015 intervention in the Syrian Civil War, and interference in the 2016 United States elections.

=== Spain ===
Since the 2008–2014 Spanish financial crisis began, Spain had had one of the highest unemployment rates in Europe, reaching a eurozone record of 21.3%. The number of unemployed people in Spain stood at 4,910,200 at the end of March 2011, up about 214,000 from the previous quarter, while the youth unemployment rate stands at 43.5%, the highest in the European Union. In September 2010 the government approved a sweeping overhaul of the labour market designed to reduce unemployment and revive the economy. Large trade unions such as CCOO and Unión General de Trabajadores (UGT), among other minor ones, rejected the plan because it made it easier and cheaper for employers to hire and fire workers. Trade unions called for the first general strike in a decade, on 29 September 2010.

The anti-austerity movement in Spain, also referred to as the 15-M Movement and the Indignados Movement, was a series of protests, demonstrations, and occupations against austerity policies in Spain that began around the local and regional elections of 2011 and 2012. First starting on 15 May 2011, many of the subsequent demonstrations spread through various social networks such as Real Democracy NOW (Spanish: Democracia Real YA) and Youth Without a Future (Spanish: Juventud Sin Futuro). According to RTVE, the Spanish public broadcasting company, between 6.5 and 8 million Spaniards participated in these events.

==== Catalonia ====
The 2009–2011 Catalan independence referendums, a series of non-binding and unofficial referendums, "popular votes" (consultes populars), took place in municipalities around Catalonia. In them voters indicated whether they supported Catalan independence from Spain. The first such referendum took place in Arenys de Munt on 13 September 2009: there followed votes in Sant Jaume de Frontanyà on 12 December and in 166 other municipalities on 13 December. Another vote ensued in April 2011 in Barcelona. Provisional figures for the 13 December vote suggest a turnout of around 200,000 (30% of those eligible to vote).

The 2012 Catalan independence demonstration was a protest march which occurred in central Barcelona in Catalonia, Spain, on 11 September 2012 during the National Day of Catalonia. Many newspapers and other news agencies described it as a "historic" demonstration and considered it to be the biggest protest march ever held in Catalonia since the restoration of democracy in Spain, surpassing other major demonstrations, including the 2010 Catalan autonomy protest.

A non-binding Catalan self-determination referendum was held on Sunday, 9 November 2014, to gauge support on the political future of Catalonia. While also referred to as "Catalan independence referendum", the vote was rebranded as a "participation process" by the Government of Catalonia, after a "non-referendum popular consultation" on the same topic and for the same date had been suspended by the Constitutional Court of Spain.

The 2017–2018 Spanish constitutional crisis started after the law intending to allow the 2017 Catalan independence referendum was denounced by the Spanish government under Prime Minister Mariano Rajoy and subsequently suspended by the Constitutional Court until it ruled on the issue. Some international media outlets have described the events as "one of the worst political crises in modern Spanish history".

The Catalan independence referendum of 2017 was held on 1 October 2017 in the Spanish autonomous community of Catalonia, passed by the Parliament of Catalonia as the Law on the Referendum on Self-determination of Catalonia and called by the Generalitat de Catalunya. It was declared unconstitutional on 7 September 2017 and suspended by the Constitutional Court of Spain after a request from the Spanish government, who declared it a breach of the Spanish Constitution. Additionally, in early September the High Court of Justice of Catalonia had issued orders to the police to try to prevent it, including the detention of various persons responsible for its preparation. Due to alleged irregularities during the voting process as well as to the use of force by the National Police Corps and Civil Guard, international observers invited by the Generalitat declared that the referendum failed to meet the minimum international standards for elections.

On 27 October, the Catalan parliament voted in a secret ballot to unilaterally declare independence from Spain, with most deputies of the opposition boycotting a vote considered illegal for violating the decisions of the Constitutional Court of Spain, as the lawyers of the Parliament of Catalonia warned. As a result, the government of Spain invoked the Constitution to remove the regional authorities and enforce direct rule the next day, with a regional election being subsequently called for 21 December 2017 to elect a new Parliament of Catalonia. Puigdemont and part of his cabinet fled to Belgium after being ousted, as the Spanish Attorney General pressed for charges of sedition, rebellion and misuse of public funds against them.

The trial of Catalonia independence leaders began on 12 February 2019 in the Supreme Court of Spain, in which 12 people were tried, including the previous vice president Oriol Junqueras of the regional government and most of the cabinet as well as political activists Jordi Sànchez and Jordi Cuixart and the former speaker of the Parliament of Catalonia Carme Forcadell. Nine of the 12 accused received prison sentences for the crimes of sedition; of them, four were also found guilty of misuse of public funds. Their sentences ranged from 9 to 13 years. The remaining three accused were found guilty of disobedience and were sentenced to pay a fine but received no prison term. The court dismissed the charges of rebellion. The verdict delivered by the Supreme Court sparked multiple protests across the region.

=== United Kingdom ===
Following the 2010 general election, negotiations led to David Cameron becoming prime minister as the head of a coalition government with the Liberal Democrats – the youngest holder of the office since the 1810s and the first coalition government in the country's history since World War II. His premiership was marked by the effects of the Great Recession; these involved a large deficit in government finances that his government sought to reduce through austerity measures. His administration passed the Health and Social Care Act and the Welfare Reform Act, which introduced large-scale changes to healthcare and welfare. He also enforced stricter immigration policies, introduced reforms to education and oversaw the 2012 London Olympics. The government privatised the Royal Mail and some other state assets, and legalised same-sex marriage in England and Wales. The Scottish National Party (SNP) became dominant in Scotland over the decade, with a referendum on Scottish independence held in 2014, returning a negative result.

When the Conservatives secured an unexpected majority in the 2015 general election, Cameron remained as prime minister, this time leading a Conservative-only government. Meanwhile, the Conservative's coalition partner, the Liberal Democrats, saw their worst result in the party's modern history. Also in 2015, the Labour Party elected Jeremy Corbyn as its leader, who was considered the most left-wing leader of the party since Michael Foot (1980–83). Cameron's second ministry was dominated by the 2016 referendum on the UK's continuing membership of the EU. Cameron introduced the referendum in order to fulfill a manifesto pledge, but campaigned on the side of the "remain" vote, along with most of the other major parties. Some members of the Conservatives, as well as the Democratic Unionist Party (DUP) and UK Independence Party (UKIP), campaigned to "leave." The "leave" vote unexpectedly won, and a few hours later Cameron announced he would resign. A leadership election was held and Cameron was succeeded by Theresa May.

May became the UK's second female prime minister after Margaret Thatcher, as well as the first woman to hold two of the Great Offices of State. She began the process of withdrawing the UK from the European Union, triggering Article 50 in March 2017. The following month, she announced a snap general election, with the aims of strengthening her hand in Brexit negotiations and campaigning on "strong and stable" leadership. This election resulted in a hung parliament, in which the Conservatives actually losing seats, despite the party winning its highest vote share since 1983. The loss of an overall majority prompted her to enter a confidence and supply arrangement with the DUP of Northern Ireland to support a minority government. After versions of her draft withdrawal agreement were rejected by Parliament three times, she resigned in 2019 and was succeeded by Boris Johnson, her former Foreign Secretary. Following further defeats in Parliament, Johnson prorogued parliament, an act deemed illegal by the Supreme Court. Johnson then called a snap election in 2019, where he campaigned on a platform to "Get Brexit Done." The Conservatives won the largest majority in the House of Commons since the 1987 election, leading to the passing of a Brexit deal early in the next decade.

==== Premierships ====
David Cameron's tenure as Prime Minister of the United Kingdom began on 11 May 2010 when he accepted an invitation from Queen Elizabeth II to form a government, succeeding Gordon Brown of the Labour Party, and ended on 13 July 2016 upon his resignation following the 2016 referendum that favoured Brexit, which he had opposed. As prime minister, Cameron also served simultaneously as First Lord of the Treasury, Minister for the Civil Service, and Leader of the Conservative Party.

Following the 2010 general election, Cameron became prime minister at the head of a coalition government between the Conservatives and Liberal Democrats, as no party had gained an overall majority in the House of Commons for the first time since the February 1974 general election. He appointed Nick Clegg, Leader of the Liberal Democrats, Deputy Prime Minister. Between them, the Conservatives and Liberal Democrats controlled 363 seats in the House of Commons, with a majority of 76 seats.

Cameron's premiership was marked by the effects of the 2008 financial crisis and the Great Recession; these involved a large deficit in government finances that his government sought to reduce through austerity measures. His administration passed the Health and Social Care Act and Welfare Reform Act, which introduced large-scale changes to healthcare and welfare. It also enforced stricter immigration policies, introduced reforms to education and oversaw the 2012 London Olympics. It privatised the Royal Mail and legalised same-sex marriage in Great Britain. After the 2015 general election, he remained as prime minister, this time leading a Conservative-only government with a parliamentary majority of 12. To fulfil a manifesto pledge, Cameron introduced a referendum on the UK's continuing membership of the European Union in 2016. He supported the Britain Stronger in Europe campaign. Following the success of the Leave vote, Cameron resigned as prime minister and was succeeded by Theresa May, his home secretary.

As prime minister, Cameron was credited for helping to modernise the Conservative Party and reducing the deficit. However, he was subject to a level of criticism for the 2015 manifesto commitment to implement the referendum on the UK's continued membership of the EU and his vocal support for remain, which ultimately led to his resignation as prime minister. This led to a sustained period of political instability. The austerity measures introduced by Cameron's chancellor George Osborne failed to reduce unemployment, lower interest rates and stimulate growth, and were linked to worsened inequality and poverty and a rise in political instability. In historical rankings of prime ministers, academics and journalists have ranked him in the third and fourth quintiles.

Theresa May's tenure as Prime Minister of the United Kingdom began on 13 July 2016 when she accepted an invitation from Queen Elizabeth II to form a government, succeeding David Cameron, and ended on 24 July 2019 upon her resignation. May's premiership was dominated by Brexit, terrorist attacks in Westminster, the Manchester Arena and London Bridge, the Grenfell Tower fire, and the Salisbury poisonings. As prime minister, May also served simultaneously as First Lord of the Treasury, Minister for the Civil Service, and Leader of the Conservative Party.

May was elected unopposed after her opponent, Andrea Leadsom, withdrew from the final round of the 2016 leadership election; May became Conservative leader on 11 July 2016, and she became prime minister two days later. She began the process of withdrawing the UK from the European Union, triggering Article 50 in March 2017. The following month, she announced a snap general election, with the aims of strengthening her hand in Brexit negotiations and highlighting her "strong and stable" leadership. This resulted in a hung parliament in which the number of Conservative seats had fallen from 330 to 317, despite the party winning its highest vote share since 1983. The loss of an overall majority prompted her to enter a confidence and supply arrangement with the Democratic Unionist Party (DUP) of Northern Ireland to support a minority government.

May carried out the Brexit negotiations with the European Union, adhering to the Chequers Plan, which resulted in her draft Brexit withdrawal agreement. She also announced a £20 billion increase in funding to the National Health Service through the NHS Long Term Plan, established the first-ever Race Disparity Audit and launched a 25 Year Environment Plan, amending the Climate Change Act 2008 to end the UK's contribution to global warming by 2050. Unemployment in the United Kingdom fell to record lows, the lowest jobless rate since 1975. Her government also passed legislation cracking down on knife crime and giving extra powers to law enforcement and intelligence services to combat terrorism, published the 2017 Industrial Strategy White Paper and signed an immigration treaty with France to stem illegal border crossings in January 2018.

Although May did not succeed in getting much of her Brexit legislation through Parliament, her government was nevertheless responsible for passing the Great Repeal Act and for negotiating and approving the near-entirety of the UK's terms of exit from the EU. Three budgets were passed during her tenure: the first in March 2017, the second in November 2017 and the third and final in October 2018. May was also a prominent figure in leading the international condemnation and response to Russia over the Salisbury poisonings of Sergei and Yulia Skripal in March 2018. May survived two votes of no confidence in December 2018 and January 2019, but after versions of her draft withdrawal agreement were rejected by Parliament three times and her party's poor performance in the May 2019 European Parliament election, she left office on 24 July and was succeeded by Boris Johnson, her former Foreign Secretary. May is viewed unfavourably in historical rankings and public opinion of British prime ministers.

Boris Johnson's tenure as Prime Minister of the United Kingdom began on 24 July 2019 when he accepted an invitation from Queen Elizabeth II to form a government, succeeding Theresa May, and ended on 6 September 2022 upon his resignation. Johnson's premiership was dominated by Brexit, the COVID-19 pandemic, the Russian invasion of Ukraine, and the cost of living crisis. As prime minister, Johnson also served simultaneously as First Lord of the Treasury, Minister for the Civil Service, Minister for the Union, and Leader of the Conservative Party.

Johnson defeated Jeremy Hunt in the 2019 Conservative Party leadership election on 23 July 2019, and was appointed prime minister the following day. He re-opened Brexit negotiations with the European Union and in early September he prorogued Parliament; the Supreme Court later ruled the prorogation to have been unlawful. After agreeing to a revised Brexit withdrawal agreement but failing to win parliamentary support, Johnson called a snap general election to be held in December 2019, which the Conservative Party won in its first landslide victory since 1987. During Johnson's premiership, the government responded to the COVID-19 pandemic by introducing various emergency powers to mitigate its impact and approved a nationwide vaccination programme. He also responded to the Russian invasion of Ukraine by imposing sanctions on Russia and authorising foreign aid and weapons shipments to Ukraine.

In the Partygate scandal it was found that numerous parties had been held at 10 Downing Street during national COVID-19 lockdowns, and COVID-19 social distancing laws were breached by 83 individuals, including Johnson, who in April 2022 was issued with a fixed penalty notice. The publishing of the Sue Gray report in May 2022 and a widespread sense of dissatisfaction led in June 2022 to a vote of confidence in his leadership amongst Conservative MPs, which he won. In July 2022, revelations over his appointment of Chris Pincher as deputy chief whip of the party while knowing of allegations of sexual misconduct against him led to a mass resignation of members of his government and to Johnson announcing his resignation as prime minister. Following the July–September 2022 Conservative Party leadership election, Johnson was succeeded as prime minister by Liz Truss, his foreign secretary.

Johnson is seen by many as a controversial figure in British politics. His supporters have praised him for being humorous, witty, and entertaining, with an appeal reaching beyond traditional Conservative Party voters, making him, in their view, an electoral asset to the party. Conversely, his critics have accused him of lying, elitism, cronyism, bigotry and what some perceive as imposing excessive measures and restrictions during the COVID-19 pandemic whilst he was holding parties in Westminister. As prime minister, his supporters praised him for "getting Brexit done", overseeing the UK's COVID-19 vaccination programme, which was amongst the fastest in the world, and being one of the first world leaders to offer foreign aid to Ukraine following the Russian invasion of the country. Within Ukraine, Johnson is praised by many as a supporter of anti-Russian sanctions and military aid for Ukraine. His tenure also saw several controversies and scandals, and is viewed as the most scandalous premiership of modern British history by historians and biographers alike.

Under Boris Johnson's premiership, Britain imposed strict regulations on daily life during the COVID-19 lockdown. During this lockdown, Boris Johnson established what some critics say amounted to a COVID dictatorship whereby all manners of life became tightly controlled. Socialisation was curtailed, people were restricted from holding gatherings, and even mild interaction with others, even in one's own house, could result in arrest. Although not mandatory, vaccination programmes were heavily encouraged, and the effectiveness of the vaccines and the necessity, strictness and fairness of the lockdowns are still debated today.

== See also ==
- 2010s in history
- 2020s in history
