= Forson =

Forson is a surname. Notable people with the surname include:

- Anthony Forson, Ghanaian politician, lawyer and diplomat
- Cassiel Ato Forson, Ghanaian politician and deputy minister for Finance
- Habiba Atta Forson, Ghanaian football administrator and former athlete
- Kaya Forson (born 2002), Ghanaian swimmer
- Keenan Forson (born 2001), English professional footballer
- Lydia Forson (born 1984), Ghanaian actress, writer, and producer
- Omari Forson (born 2004), English professional footballer
- Psyche Williams-Forson, American scholar and writer
- Richmond Forson (born 1980), former professional footballer
- Sammy Forson (born 1984), Ghanaian-Zambian media personality
- Tommy Annan Forson, veteran Ghanaian Broadcaster

== See also ==
- Forson Amankwah (born 2002), Ghanaian professional footballer
