= Foreign policy of the Angela Merkel government =

Foreign policy of Germany's Angela Merkel government

The foreign policy of the Angela Merkel government has been the foreign policy of Germany when Merkel was in office as Chancellor of Germany from November 2005 to December 2021. During Merkel's chancellorship, Merkel has personally been highly active in the field of the foreign policy. She named Frank-Walter Steinmeier to serve as Minister for Foreign Affairs from 2005 to 2009; the office was subsequently held by Guido Westerwelle from 2009 to 2013, and again by Steinmeier from 2013. He was succeeded by Sigmar Gabriel in 2017, who was himself succeeded by Heiko Maas in 2018.

Merkel has emphasized international cooperation, both in the context of the European Union and NATO. Merkel played a central role in the negotiation of the Treaty of Lisbon and the Berlin Declaration. Merkel played a crucial role in managing the 2008 financial crisis at the European and international level.

Merkel has been widely described as the de facto leader of the European Union throughout her tenure as Chancellor. Merkel has twice been named the world's second most powerful person by Forbes magazine, the highest ranking ever achieved by a woman. In December 2015, Merkel was named as Time magazine's Person of the Year, with the magazine's cover declaring her to be the "Chancellor of the Free World." On 26 March 2014, Merkel became the longest-serving incumbent head of government in the European Union and she is currently the senior G7 leader. In May 2016, Merkel was named the most powerful woman in the world for a record tenth time by Forbes. In 2016 Merkel was described by The New York Times as "the Liberal West's Last Defender" and by Timothy Garton Ash as "the leader of the free world." Following the announcement that Merkel will run for a fourth term as Chancellor, the Chairman of the Foreign Affairs Committee Norbert Röttgen has said that Merkel desires to hold "the liberal order, in the trans-Atlantic area, together" and that "the Chancellor is a cornerstone of [the] political concept of the West as acting as a global player."

== Brazil ==
Brazil is part of the countries with which Germany maintains a "high level" relationship. In 2013, after the revelation that the Brazilian Presidency and the German Chancellery were spied on by the United States intelligence service, Angela Merkel moved closer to Brazil. During the 2014 World Cup, she traveled to Brazil to watch games alongside President Dilma Rousseff, and in August of the following year she returned to the country with a strong delegation of seven ministers and five secretaries of state.

== China ==
On 25 September 2007, Merkel met the 14th Dalai Lama for "private and informal talks" in the Chancellery in Berlin amid protest from China. China afterwards cancelled separate talks with German officials, including talks with Justice Minister Brigitte Zypries.

In recognition of the importance of China to the German economy, by 2014 Merkel had led seven trade delegations to China since assuming office in 2005. The same year, in March, China's President Xi Jinping visited Germany.

In response to the death of Chinese Nobel Peace Prize laureate Liu Xiaobo, who died of organ failure while in government custody, Merkel said in a statement that Liu had been a "courageous fighter for civil rights and freedom of expression."

In July 2019, the UN ambassadors from 22 nations, including Germany, signed a joint letter to the UNHRC condemning China's mistreatment of the Uyghurs as well as its mistreatment of other minority groups, urging the Chinese government to close the Xinjiang re-education camps.

== United States ==
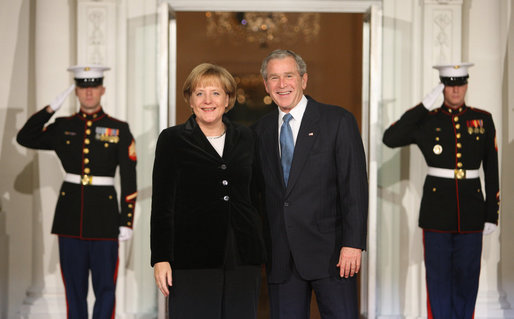
Merkel with U.S. President George W. Bush in White House, 14 November 2008

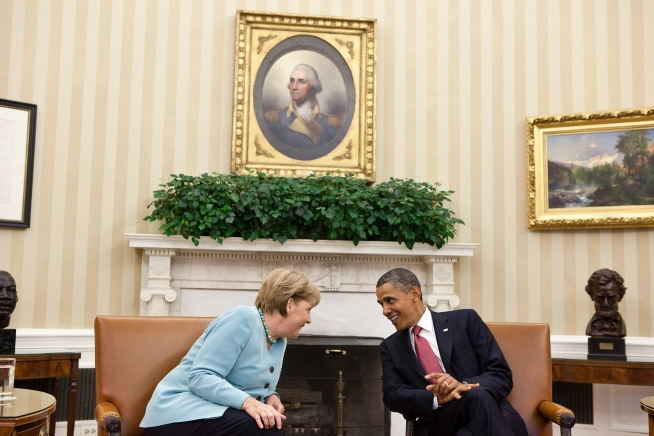
Merkel with U.S. President Barack Obama in Washington, D.C., 7 June 2011

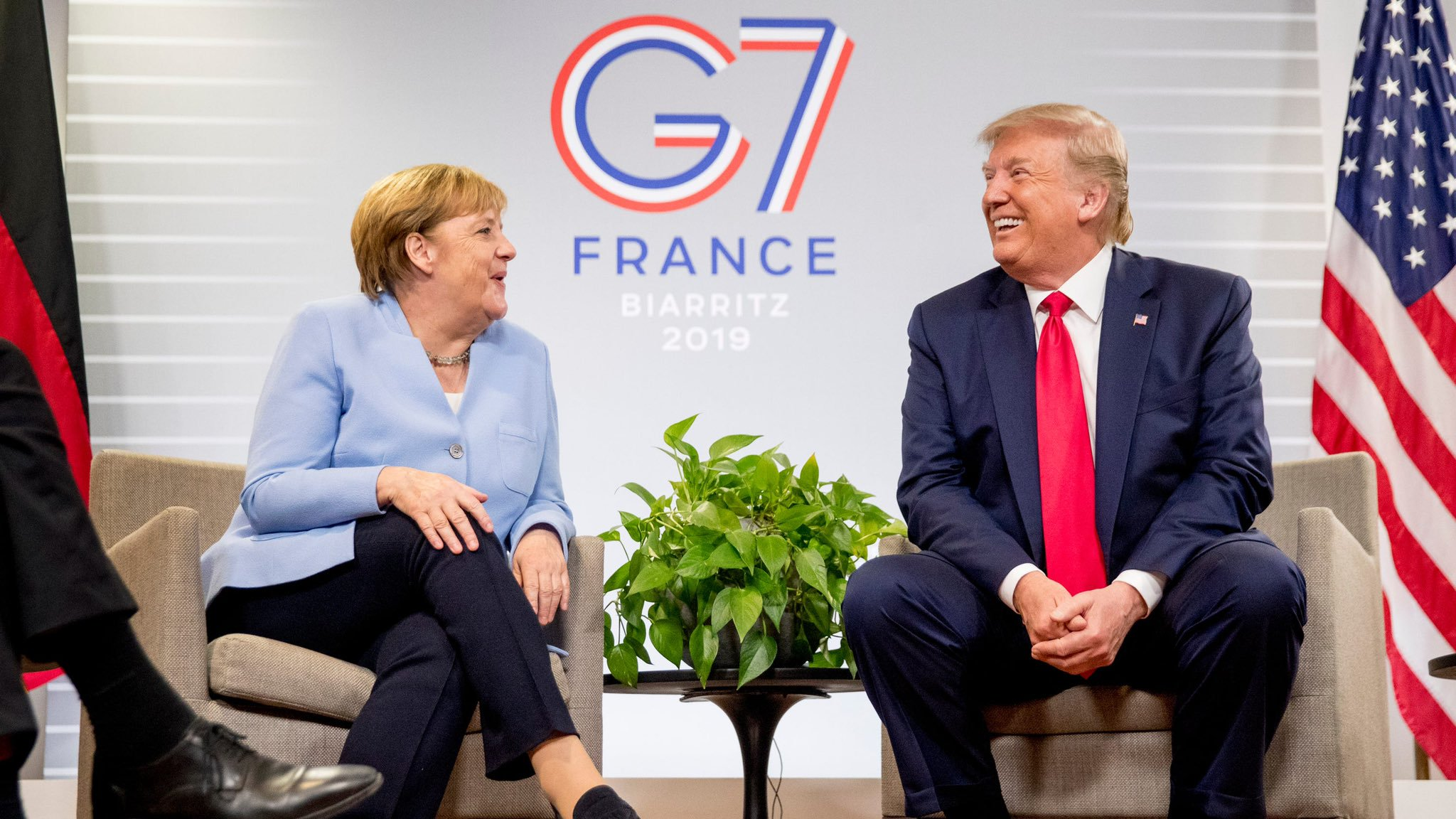
Angela Merkel with U.S. President Donald Trump at the G7 Summit in Biarritz, France, 26 August 2019

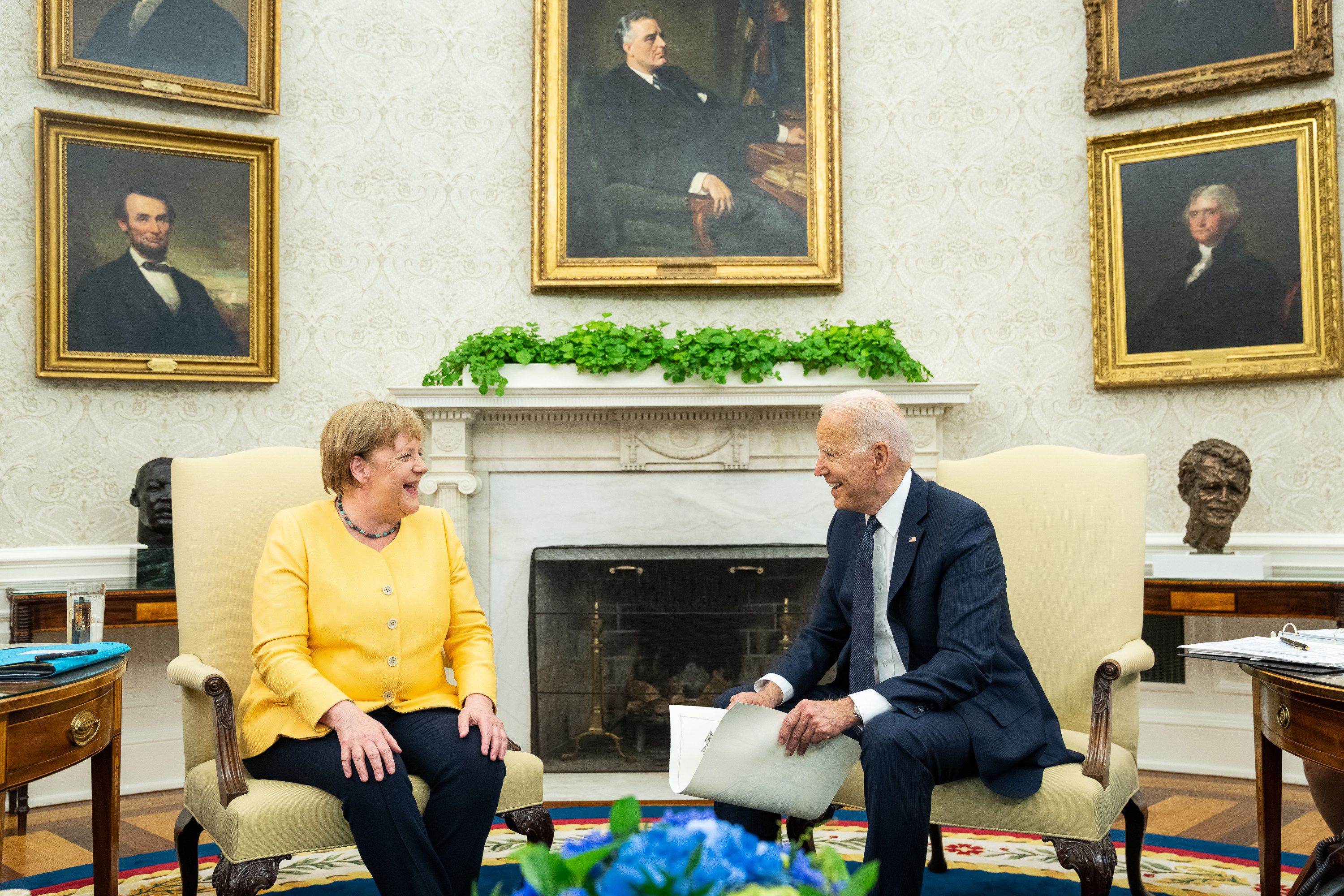
Merkel with U.S. President Joe Biden in Washington, D.C., 15 July 2021

One of Merkel's priorities was strengthening transatlantic economic relations. She signed the agreement for the Transatlantic Economic Council on 30 April 2007 at the White House. The Council, co-chaired by an EU and a US official, aims at removing barriers to trade in a further integrated transatlantic free-trade area.

It was revealed that, beginning in 2002, Merkel's phone has been "on an NSA target list". On July 1, 2013, the German Foreign Ministry summoned Phil Murphy, the U.S. Ambassador to Germany, over allegations that the National Security Agency (NSA) had spied on institutions of the European Union. It was revealed that Germany's BND intelligence service has covertly monitored European defence interests and politicians inside Germany at the request of the NSA. A German Parliamentary Committee investigating the NSA spying scandal was set up in 2013. Merkel compared the NSA to the Stasi when it became known that her mobile phone was tapped by that agency. In response, Susan Rice pledged that the US would desist from spying on her personally, but said there would not be a no-espionage agreement between the two countries.

U.S. President Barack Obama described her at the end of 2016 as his "closest international partner" throughout his tenure as President. Obama also said he would vote for Merkel if he could. Obama's farewell visit to Berlin in November 2016 was widely interpreted as the passing of the torch of global liberal leadership to Merkel as Merkel was seen by many as the new standard bearer of liberal democracy since the election of Donald Trump as U.S. President.

Upon the election of Donald Trump Merkel said that "Germany and America are tied by values of democracy, freedom and respect for the law and human dignity, independent of origin, skin colour, religion, gender, sexual orientation or political views. I offer the next president of the United States, Donald Trump, close cooperation on the basis of these values." The comment was interpreted as reintegrative shaming. President Obama's final phone call as U.S. President was to Merkel, during which he thanked her for her "strong, courageous, and steady leadership" and expressed "appreciation for their personal friendship."

Following the G7 Summit in Italy and the NATO Summit in Brussels, Merkel stated on May 28, 2017 that the US was no longer the reliable partner Europe and Germany had depended on in the past. At an electoral rally in Munich, she said that "We have to know that we must fight for our future on our own, for our destiny as Europeans", which has been interpreted as an unprecedented shift in the German-American transatlantic relationship.

== Russia ==
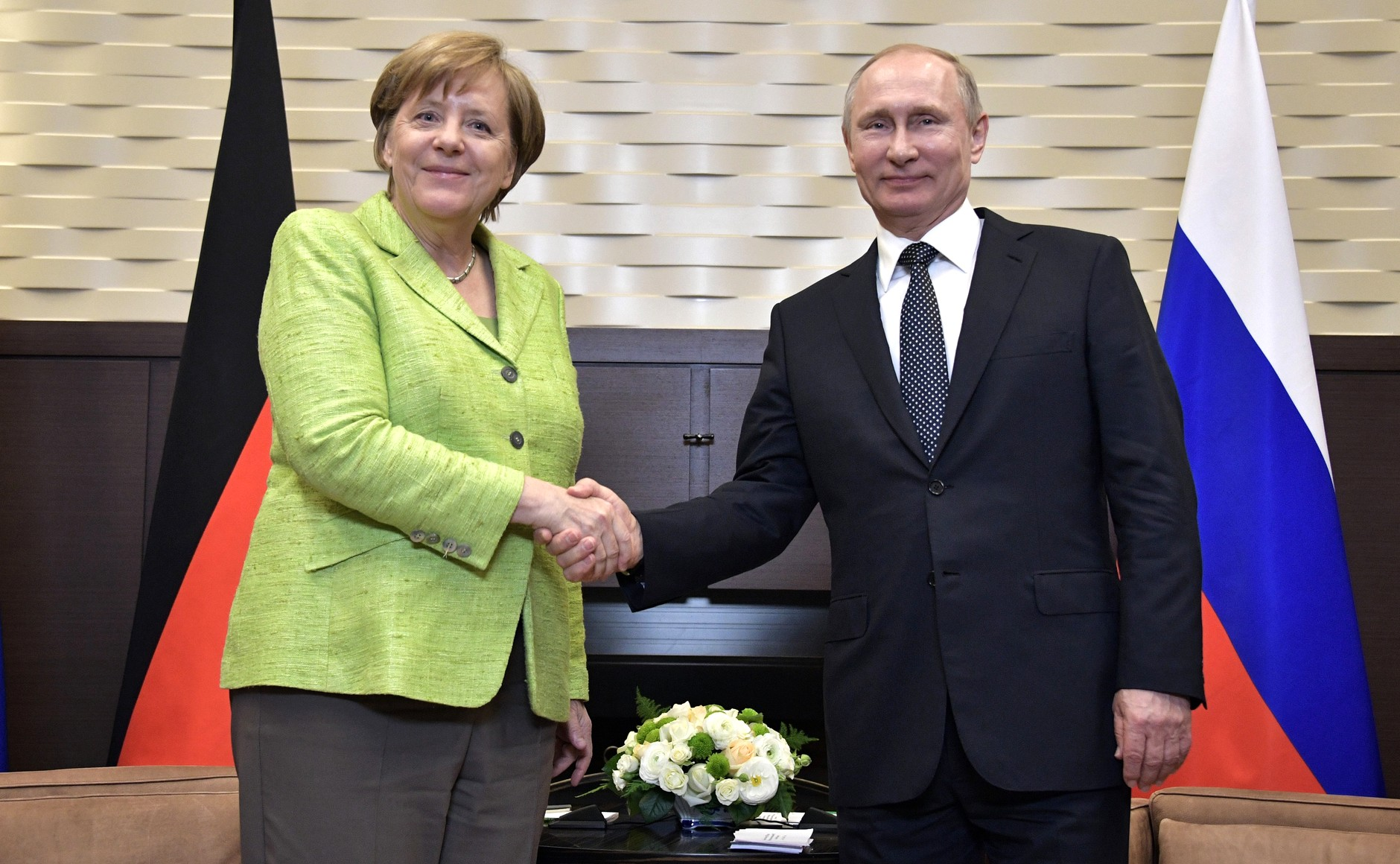
Merkel with Russian President Vladimir Putin in Sochi, May 2017

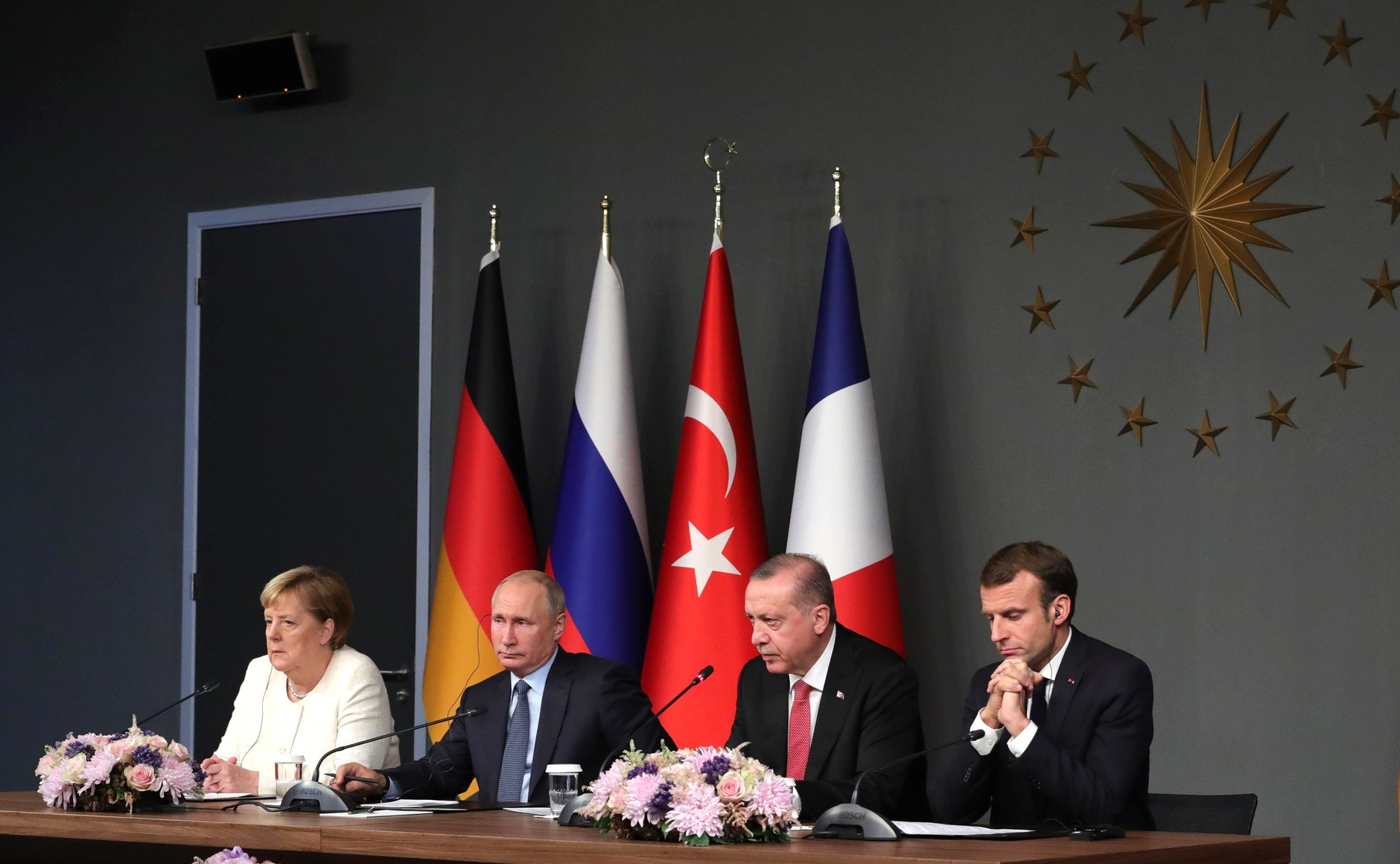
Merkel, Putin, Erdoğan and Macron when giving a press conference as part of Syria summit in Istanbul, Turkey, 26 October 2018

In 2006, Merkel expressed concern about overreliance on Russian energy, but she received little support from others in Berlin.

In June 2017, Merkel criticized the draft of new U.S. sanctions against Russia that target EU–Russia energy projects, including Nord Stream 2 gas pipeline.

== Middle East and North Africa ==
Merkel voiced concern over the 2006 Lebanon War. She stated: "We cannot confuse cause and effect. The starting point is the capture of the Israeli soldiers. It is important that the government in Lebanon, which is on a peaceful path, should be strengthened, but it must be made clear that the capture [of the soldiers] cannot be tolerated. The attacks did not start from the Israeli side, but from Hezbollah's side."

Merkel's government has approved multi-billion euro arms export deals with various governments in the MENA region generally perceived as being authoritarian, including Qatar, Saudi Arabia. the United Arab Emirates, Bahrain and Egypt. In 2016, German opposition parties criticized Germany's defense plan with Saudi Arabia, which has been waging war in Yemen against the Houthis and has been accused of massive human rights violations. In a TV debate in September 2017, Merkel and her then challenger Martin Schulz both said that they would seek an end to Turkey's membership talks with the European Union. On 21 March 2018, Merkel criticized Turkey's invasion of northern Syria: "Despite all justified security interests of Turkey, it's unacceptable what's happening in Afrin, where thousands and thousands of civilians are being pursued, are dying or have to flee."

== India ==
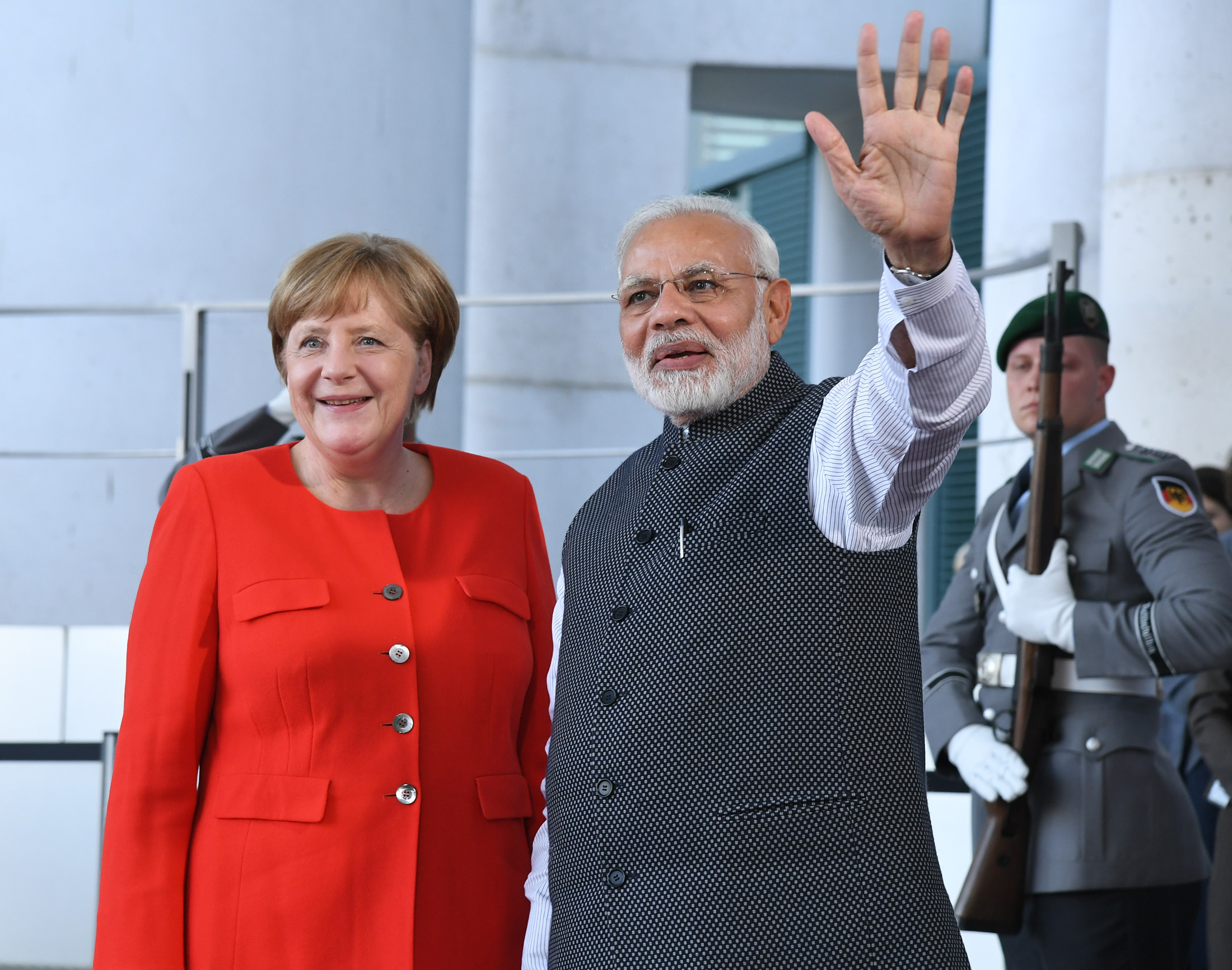
Merkel with Indian Prime Minister Narendra Modi in Berlin, Germany, 28 April 2018

Merkel and Indian Prime Minister Manmohan Singh made a "Joint Declaration" emphasising the Indo-German strategic partnership in 2006. It turned the focus of future cooperation onto the fields of energy, science and technology, and defence. A similar Declaration, signed during Merkel's visit to India in 2007, noted the substantial progress made in Indo-German relations and set ambitious goals for their development in the future. The relationship with India on the basis of cooperation and partnership was further strengthened with Merkel's visit to India in 2011. At the invitation of the Indian government, the two countries held their first intergovernmental consultations in New Delhi. These consultations set a new standard in the implementation of the strategic partnership, as India became only the third non-European country with which Germany has had this nature of comprehensive consultations. India became the first Asian country to hold a joint cabinet meeting with Germany during Merkel's state visit.

The Indian government presented the Jawaharlal Nehru Award for International Understanding for the year 2009 to Merkel. A statement issued by the Government of India stated that the award "recognises her personal devotion and enormous efforts for sustainable and equitable development, for good governance and understanding and for the creation of a world better positioned to handle the emerging challenges of the 21st century."

== Refugee crisis of 2015 ==
Germany was affected by the European migrant crisis in 2015 as it became the final destination of choice for many asylum seekers from Africa and the Middle East entering the EU. The civil war in Syria was the main cause. Merkel made a highly controversial statement in August 2015: "We will manage it," taken to mean Germany would be able to handle large numbers successfully. The country took in over a million refugees and migrants and developed a quota system which redistributed migrants around its federal states based on their tax income and existing population density. The decision by Merkel to authorize unrestricted entry led to heavy criticism in Germany as well as within Europe. This was a major factor in the rise of the far-right party Alternative for Germany which entered the Bundestag in the 2017 federal election.

According to Ludger Pries,

Merkel's statement to keep Germany's commitment to refugee protection probably gave hope and expectations to refugees. However, it neither originated nor significantly intensified the refugee movement. When Merkel's declaration was made, hundreds of thousands of refugees already were on the trek, and it was just a matter of pragmatic, realist and humanitarian policy not to close national borders. The reasons for choosing Germany changed according to the time when refugees arrived in Germany; but not in the way predicted by all those who blame Merkel and the German government for having caused or at least increased the so-called refugee crisis.
