= Lunch trading =

Exchange of foods and drinks

A schematic of trading patterns at a school cafeteria table. Circles represent students, Roman numerals represent groups, grey dotted lines represent movement, and black solid lines represent the flow of foods. (Note: Based on Nukaga 2008, p. 375–376.)

Lunch trading is the exchange—usually in the form of bartering—of foods and drinks, usually done by students of primary and secondary schools. Such exchanges form economies, with students as economic agents. Trading commonly occurs in cafeterias during lunchtime, but may occur elsewhere within a school. The values of foods and drinks are created through negotiations, to be exchanged for other desirable foods or for money. While the foods and drinks traded vary, the most common are desserts, entrées, and vegetables.

== Concept ==
While often described as "trading" lunches, the concept is usually a form of bartering, in which children exchange foods and drinks. (Note: Foods and drinks are the most commonly bartered items among students, with most bartering in general occurring in elementary school.) While not as common as bartering, food and drinks can also be traded between students in exchange for money. These exchanges form an economy, with students as economic agents. It has been suggested that students specifically form a gift economy, with it being partly autonomous in the absence of adult intervention.

=== Values of foods and drinks ===
There are no unified values for foods or drinks among all students. Such values are created through negotiations, with certain foods and drinks serving as economic status symbols. While trading encompasses all foods and drinks available to students, the most commonly traded parts of a meal include main courses, vegetables, and desserts.

Generally, desserts and snacks brought from a student's home—sometimes characterized as junk food—are frequently traded. In the instance of a food craze, students bring or buy foods which are briefly desirable by other students. Bustle writer Lara Rutherford-Morrison states that, in the 1990s, a dessert or snack had to have four main qualities: being prepackaged, having a high sugar content, having colorants, and being "the object of an intense televised marketing campaign, preferably involving some kind of animated mascot."

In a 2008 study, two classifications of foods were designated by students: dry foods and wet foods. Dry foods included various candies, potato chips, and prepackaged meals; and wet foods included sandwiches, pizza, burritos and bulgogi. Dry foods were traded significantly more than wet foods, as wet foods were considered "contaminated" when touched by the donor; this would result in disgust from the recipient.

=== Societal effects ===
In the US, trading may cause students to eat less than the one third of the Recommended Daily Allowance in lunches served by the National School Lunch Program (NSLP), or more calories than what is recommended by either a student's parents or the student's school. Nutrient-rich foods—including fruits and vegetables—are traded for foods with empty calories. Trading has caused emotional pressure for some parents, including those whose children have allergies. With a few exceptions, schools in the US discourage and prohibit the act of trading lunches to protect students for health-related reasons, such as allergies or improperly-stored foods.

Trading continues despite such prohibitions, with secrecy sometimes being required for trading. Writing for the Journal of Contemporary Enthography, University of California researcher Misako Nukaga had stated that students form solidarity, in a similar manner that resembles Émile Durkheim's concept of collective effervescence. In reference to its illicitness, she described trading as "the underlife of school lunchtime [emphasis in original]". Others have used the term black market to describe trading.

== Studies ==
Due to its nature, there are few studies about lunch trading, and its origin is unknown.

=== Canada ===
Canada does not have an equivalent to the National School Lunch Program found in the United States; independent cafeterias provide food for students' purchase. In a 2022 study between three southern Canadian schools, observed behaviors included students trading despite their school's policy discouraging it, desiring "fast food" foods, (Note: Examples include chicken sandwiches, burgers, and pizza.) and favoring snacks and desserts over other foods. Students preferred foods made by in-house kitchen staff, as opposed to those made by anonymous catering services. Also observed, though not common, was lunch shaming—bullying and stigma caused by low-status food.

=== United Kingdom ===
In a 2014 study covering six secondary schools in London and South East England, students created a supply chain in which one would buy foods at extremely low prices to resell for higher prices that were considered "reasonable" to other students. The sale of these foods and drinks was against the policies of all six schools. Students tended to avoid trading in the school's cafeterias, which—as part of a mind mapping exercise—students associated with words such as fighting (including food fights), shouting, swearing, and theft. It had been suggested that trading was the result of students' distaste for school, particularly the expensive lunches implemented at that time. Some children had labelled themselves "anti-school".

=== United States ===
In the United States, several factors have been analyzed to determine how students trade lunches. In a 2001 study with a sample of 48 first-grade students and 48 fourth-grade students, the fourth-grade students had a larger probability of trading. (Note: Two first-grade students (4%) traded, while thirteen fourth-grade students (27%) traded.) In the samples, both schools prohibited the trading of lunches. In a 2008 study from two schools in Los Angeles, Latin Americans and African Americans tended to eat food served in the schools' cafeterias; White Americans and Asian Americans tended to bring foods from home, and were "at the center of" the economy. In a 2013 study of 76 students from one school in Northern California, 47 individual exchanges were made over a three-week period, with 25 of which described as sharing. (Note: In the study, sharing was described as giving food to the recipient without the donor receiving anything in return. Of the remaining 22 exchanges, 20 were described as stealing (forcibly taking food) and 2 were described as trading (exchanging one food for another).) Students who were either female or obese traded more frequently than male or non-obese students, and ended up with more food than what they initially had.

== Similar concepts ==
A similar Israeli concept, known as kibbudim (Hebrew: כיבודים; lit. 'honors'), is when a group of children negotiate a "normal[ly] size[d]" bite of a food item. Then, the food is shared throughout the group, leaving about half of the food item for the donor.

== See also ==
- No such thing as a free lunch
- Sociology of food
