= Shame =

Unpleasant self-conscious emotion

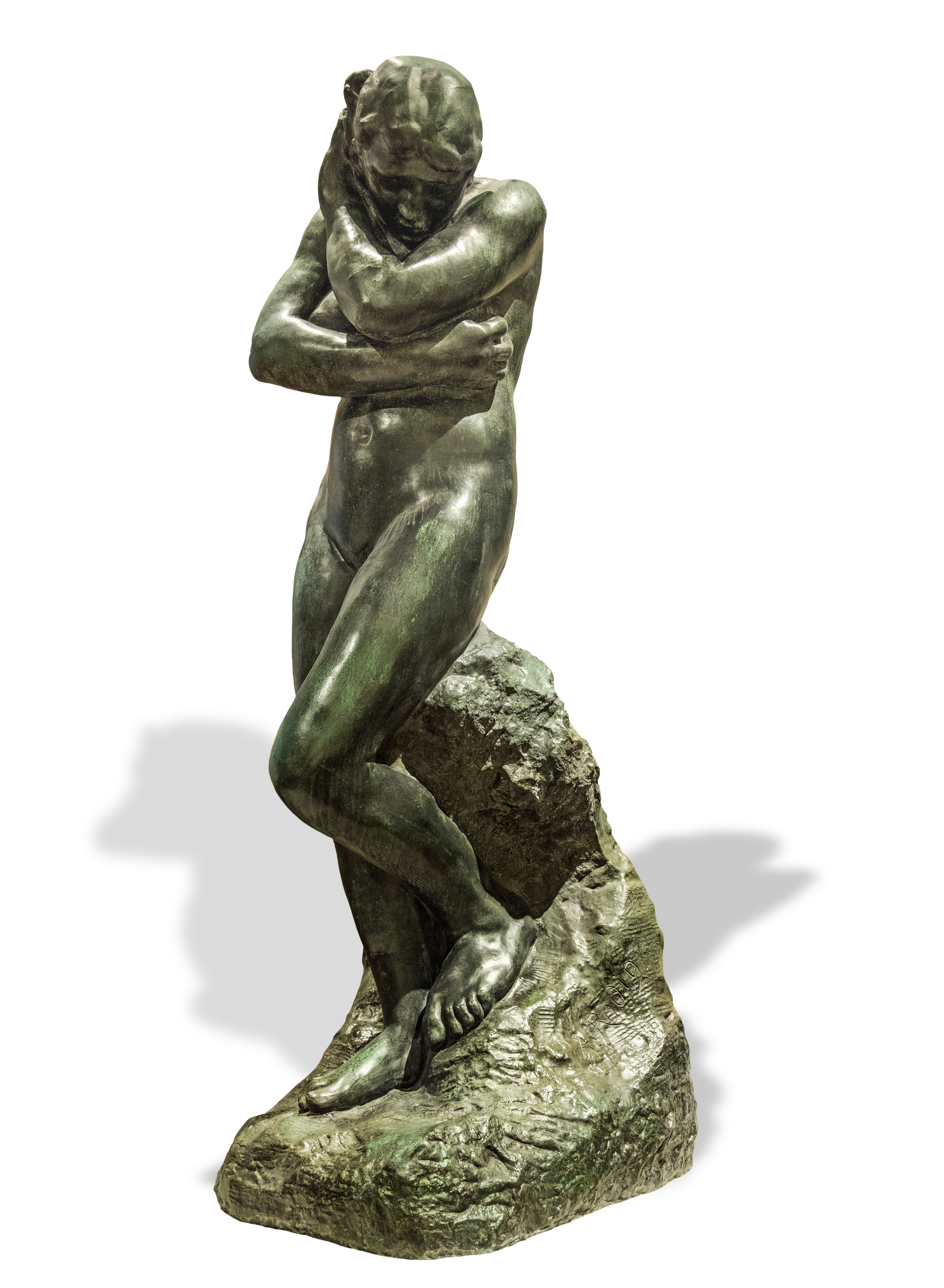
Eve covers herself and lowers her head in shame in Rodin's Eve after the Fall.

Shame is an unpleasant self-conscious emotion associated with negative self-evaluation in relation to social norms and one's personal moral standards. It can generate feelings of pain, exposure, distrust, powerlessness, and worthlessness, which in turn may give rise to anger, denial, avoidance, reduced sensitivity to shame, and a tendency to externalize blame.

== Definition ==
Shame is a discrete, basic emotion, described as a moral or social emotion that drives people to hide or deny their wrongdoings. Moral emotions are emotions that have an influence on a person's decision-making skills and monitors different social behaviors. The focus of shame is on the self or the individual with respect to a perceived audience. It can bring about profound feelings of deficiency, defeat, inferiority, unworthiness, or self-loathing. Our attention turns inward; we isolate from our surroundings and withdraw into closed-off self-absorption.

Not only do we feel alienated from others but also from the healthy parts of ourselves. This inward focus can intensify self-criticism and contribute to further emotional distress. The alienation from the world leads to painful emotions and self-deprecating thoughts and inner anguish. Empirical research demonstrates that it is dysfunctional for the individual and group level. Shame can also be described as an unpleasant self-conscious emotion that involves negative evaluation of the self.

Shame can be a painful emotion that is seen as a: "[...] comparison of the self's action with the self's standards [...]" but may equally stem from comparison of the self's state of being with the ideal social context's standard. In Western, individualistic contexts, shame is often conceptualized as an internal failure of the self, whereas collectivist cultures may interpret shame as a relational emotion tied to maintaining social harmony or fulfilling obligations to family and community. In some East Asian settings, shame can be experienced vicariously, felt on behalf of one’s social group or family. According to Neda Sedighimornani, shame is relevant in several psychological disorders such as depression, phobia of social interactions, and even some eating disorders. Some scales of shame measure it to assess emotional states, whereas other shame scales are used to assess emotional traits or dispositions: shame proneness. "To shame" generally means to actively assign or communicate a state of shame to another person.

Behaviors designed to "uncover" or "expose" others are sometimes used to place shame on the other person. Whereas, having shame means to maintain a sense of restraint against offending others (as with modesty, humility, and deference). In contrast to having shame is to have no shame; behaving without restraint, offending others, similar to other emotions like pride or hubris. This distinction between “having shame” and “being shamed” also function both as a social regulator and as a punitive tool within communities.

== Identification and self-evaluation ==
Nineteenth-century scientist Charles Darwin described shame affect in the physical form of blushing, confusion of mind, downward cast eyes, slack posture, and lowered head; Darwin noted these observations of shame affect in human populations worldwide, as mentioned in his book "The Expression of the Emotions in Man and Animals". Darwin also mentions how the sense of warmth or heat, associated with the vasodilation of the face and skin, can result in an even greater sense of shame. More commonly, the act of crying can be associated with shame.

When people feel shame, the focus of their evaluation is on the self or identity. Shame is a self-punishing acknowledgment of something gone wrong. It is associated with "mental undoing". Studies of shame showed that when ashamed people feel that their entire self is worthless, powerless, and small, they also feel exposed to an audience—real or imagined—that exists purely for the purpose of confirming that the self is worthless. Shame and the sense of self is stigmatized, or treated unfairly, like being overtly rejected by parents in favor of siblings' needs, and is assigned externally by others regardless of one's own experience or awareness. An individual who is in a state of shame will assign the shame internally from being a victim of the environment, and the shame is assigned externally, or assigned by others regardless of one's own experience or awareness.

A "sense of shame" is the feeling known as guilt but "consciousness" or awareness of "shame as a state" or condition defines core/toxic shame (Lewis, 1971; Tangney, 1998). The person experiencing shame might not be able to, or perhaps simply will not, identify their emotional state as shame, and there is an intrinsic connection between shame and the mechanism of denial. " The key emotion in all forms of shame is contempt (Miller, 1984; Tomkins, 1967). Two realms in which shame is expressed are the consciousness of self as bad and self as inadequate. People employ negative coping responses to counter deep rooted, associated sense of "shameworthiness". The shame cognition may occur as a result of the experience of shame affect or, more generally, in any situation of embarrassment, dishonor, disgrace, inadequacy, humiliation, or chagrin.

The dynamics of shame and devaluation appear to be consistent across cultures. This has led some researchers to propose the existence of a universal human psychology related to how we assign value and worth. This applies both to us and to others.

=== Behavioural expression ===
Physiological symptoms caused by the autonomic nervous system include blushing, perspiration, dizziness, or nausea. A feeling of paralysis, numbness, or loss of muscle tone might set in making it difficult to think, act, or talk. Children often visibly slump and hang their head. In an effort to hide this reaction, adults are more likely to laugh, stare, avoid eye contact, freeze their face, tighten their jaw, or show a look of contempt. In another's presence, there's a feeling of being strange, naked, transparent, or exposed, as if wanting to disappear or hide.

The Shame Code was developed to capture behavior as it unfolds in real time during the socially stressful and potentially shaming spontaneous speech task and was coded into the following categories: (1) Body Tension, (2) Facial Tension, (3) Stillness, (4) Fidgeting, (5) Nervous Positive Affect, (6) Hiding and Avoiding, (7) Verbal Flow and Uncertainty, and (8) Silence. Shame tendencies were associated with more fidgeting and less freezing, but both stillness and fidgeting were social cues that convey distress to the observer and may elicit less harsh responses. Thus, both may be an attempt to diminish further shaming experiences. Shame involves global, self-focused negative attributions based on the anticipated, imagined, or real negative evaluations of others and is accompanied by a powerful urge to hide, withdraw, or escape from the source of these evaluations. These negative evaluations arise from transgressions of standards, rules, or goals and cause the individual to feel separate from the group for which these standards, rules, or goals exist, resulting in one of the most powerful, painful, and potentially destructive experiences known to humans.

== Collectivist and Cross-Cultural Perspectives on Shame ==
Shame is experienced and conceptualized differently across cultures. So far, the focus has been centered around a Western, or individualistic perspective, where shame is primarily defined as an internalized feeling of personal failure or inadequacy. In collectivist cultures, shame is tied with social harmony, family honor, and group reputation. Chinese cultures are influenced by Confucian values and experience shame as a tool to regulate moral conduct and social cohesion. Japanese individuals, similarly, encounter both personal shame and shame felt for the actions of others within their social groups, highlighting the communal aspect of shame in collectivist contexts. Differences still exist among collectivist cultures. Analyses of language corpora from multiple cultures demonstrate cross-cultural variation in how shame, guilt, and embarrassment are conceptualized and expressed. Even within East Asia, semantic and philosophical interpretations of shame diverge. Korean shame is very closely associated with moral failure and the protection of family honor, with an individual's shame reflecting throughout their household. In Japan, shame is tied to maintaining social harmony and fulfilling expected social roles, and resulting in feelings of embarrassment or proxy shame when group norms are disrupted. While shame may be a universal self-conscious emotion, it can operate as a social function depending on the cultural norm.

== Comparison with other emotions ==
Distinguishing between shame, guilt, and embarrassment can be challenging. They are all similar reactions or emotions in the fact that they are self-conscious, "implying self-reflection and self-evaluation."

=== Comparison with guilt ===
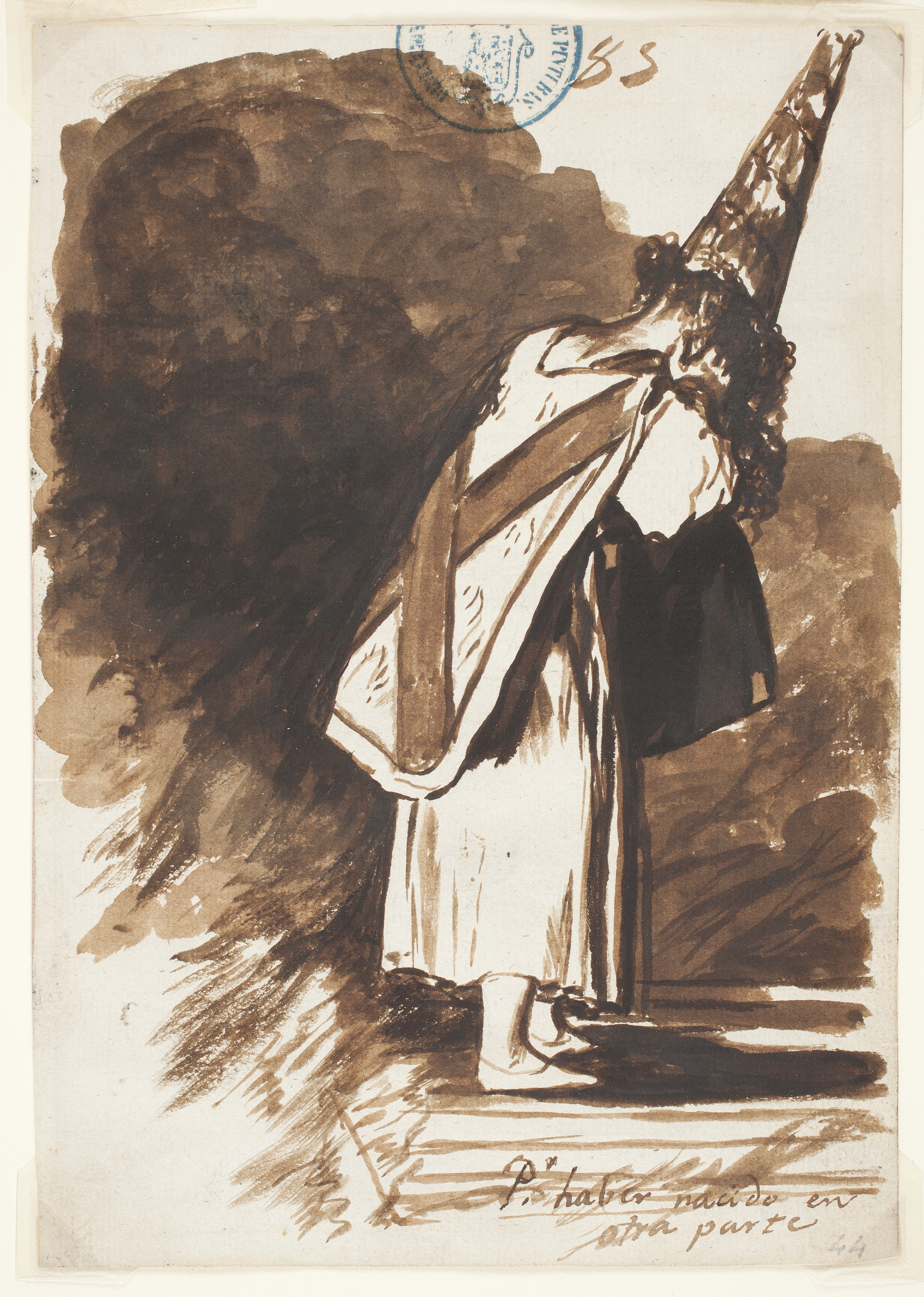
Person hiding face and showing posture of shame (while wearing a Sanbenito and coroza hat) in Goya's sketch "For being born somewhere else". The person has been shamed by the Spanish Inquisition.

According to cultural anthropologist Ruth Benedict, shame arises from a violation of cultural or social values while guilt feelings arise from violations of one's internal values. Thus shame arises when one's 'defects' are exposed to others, and results from the negative evaluation (whether real or imagined) of others; guilt, on the other hand, comes from one's own negative evaluation of oneself, for instance, when one acts contrary to one's values or idea of one's self. Shame is more attributed to internal characteristics and guilt is more attributed to behavioral characteristics. Thus, it might be possible to feel ashamed of thought or behavior that no one actually knows about (because one is afraid of what they find), and conversely, feeling guilty about the act of gaining approval from others.

Psychoanalyst Helen B. Lewis argued that, "The experience of shame is directly about the self, which is the focus of evaluation. In guilt, the self is not the central object of negative evaluation, but rather the thing done is the focus." Similarly, Fossum and Mason say in their book Facing Shame that "While guilt is a painful feeling of regret and responsibility for one's actions, shame is a painful feeling about oneself as a person."

Following this line of reasoning, Psychiatrist Judith Lewis Herman concludes that "Shame is an acutely self-conscious state in which the self is 'split,' imagining the self in the eyes of the other; by contrast, in guilt the self is unified."

Clinical psychologist Gershen Kaufman's view of shame is derived from that of affect theory, namely that shame is one of a set of instinctual, short-duration physiological reactions to stimulation. In this view, guilt is seen as a learned behavior consisting primarily of self-directed blame or contempt, and the shame that results from this behavior, making up a part of the overall experience of guilt. Here, self-blame and self-contempt mean the application, towards (a part of) one's self, of exactly the same dynamic that blaming of, and contempt for, others represents when it is applied interpersonally.

Kaufman saw that mechanisms such as blame or contempt may be used as a defending strategy against the experience of shame and that someone who has a pattern of applying them to himself may well attempt to defend against a shame experience by applying self-blame or self-contempt. This, however, can lead to an internalized, self-reinforcing sequence of shame events for which Kaufman coined the term "shame spiral". Shame can also be used as a strategy when feeling guilty, especially when the hope is to avoid punishment by inspiring compassion.

=== Comparison with embarrassment ===
One view of difference between shame and embarrassment says that shame does not necessarily involve public humiliation while embarrassment does; that is, one can feel shame for an act known only to oneself but to be embarrassed one's actions must be revealed to others. Therefore shame can only be experienced in private and embarrassment can never be experienced in private. In the field of ethics (moral psychology, in particular), however, there is debate as to whether or not shame is a heteronomous emotion, i.e. whether or not shame does involve recognition on the part of the ashamed that they have been judged negatively by others. This is a mature heteronomous type of shame where the agent does not judge themself negatively, but, due to the negative judgments of others, suspects that they may deserve negative judgment, and feel shame on this basis.

Immanuel Kant and his followers held that shame is heteronomous (comes from others); Bernard Williams and others have argued that shame can be autonomous (comes from oneself). Shame may carry the connotation of a response to something that is morally wrong whereas embarrassment is the response to something that is morally neutral but socially unacceptable.

Another view of the dividing line between shame and embarrassment holds that the difference is one of intensity. In this view embarrassment is simply a less intense experience of shame. It is adaptive and functional. Extreme or toxic shame is a much more intense experience and one that is not functional. In fact, according to this view, toxic shame can be debilitating. The dividing line then is between functional and dysfunctional shame. This includes the idea that shame has a function or benefit for the organism.

Embarrassment has occasionally been viewed as a less severe or intense form of shame, which usually varies on different aspects such as intensity, the physical reaction of the person, or the size of the present social audience, but it is distinct from shame in that it involves a focus on the self-presented to an audience rather than the entire self. It is experienced as a sense of fluster and slight mortification resulting from a social awkwardness that leads to a loss of esteem in the eyes of others. Embarrassment has been characterized as a sudden-onset sense of fluster and mortification that results when the self is evaluated negatively because one has committed, or anticipates committing, a gaffe or awkward performance before an audience. So, because shame is focused on the entire self, those who become embarrassed apologize for their mistake, and then begin to repair things and this repair involves redressing harm done to the presented self.

== Subtypes of shame ==
=== Robert Karen's types of shame ===
Psychologist Robert Karen identified four categories of shame: existential, situational, class, and narcissistic. Existential shame occurs when we become self-aware of an objective, unpleasant truth about ourselves or our situation. Situational shame is the feeling we have when violating an ethical principle, interpersonal boundary, or cultural norm. Class shame relates to social power and pertains to skin color, social class, ethnic background, and gender and occurs in societies that have rigid caste stratifications or disparate classes. Narcissistic shame occurs when our self-image and pride are wounded, affecting how we feel and think about ourselves as an individual, in contrast as a member of a group.

=== Joseph Burgo's shame paradigms ===
There are many different reasons that people might feel shame. According to Joseph Burgo, there are four different aspects of shame. He calls these aspects of shame paradigms.

- Unrequited love: "Unreciprocated love that causes yearning for more complete love."
- Unwanted exposure: Something personal that we would like to keep private is unexpectedly revealed, or when we make a mistake in [a] public [setting]."
- Disappointed expectation: "The feeling of dissatisfaction that follows the failure of expectations or hopes to manifest."
- Exclusion: Being left out of connection or involvement with others or groups that we would like to belong to.

In his first subdivision of shame he looks into is unrequited love; which is when you love someone but your partner does not reciprocate, or one is rejected by somebody that they like; this can be mortifying and shaming. Unrequited love can be shown in other ways as well. For example, the way a mother treats her new born baby. An experiment called "The Still Face Experiment" was done where a mother showed her baby love and talked to the baby for a set period of time. She then went a few minutes without talking to the baby. This resulted with the baby making different expressions to get the mother's attention. When the mother stopped giving the baby attention, the baby felt shame. According to research on unrequited love, people tend to date others who are similar in attractiveness, leaving those less attractive to feel an initial disappointment that creates a type of unrequited love in the person. The second type of shame is unwanted exposure. This would take place if you were called out in front of a whole class for doing something wrong or if someone saw you doing something you did not want them to see. This is what you would normally think of when you hear the word shame. Disappointed expectation would be your third type of shame according to Burgo. This could be not passing a class, having a friendship go wrong, or not getting a big promotion in a job that you thought you would get. The fourth and final type of shame according to Burgo is exclusion which also means being left out. Many people will do anything to just fit in or want to belong in society, e.g., at school, work, friendships, relationships, everywhere.

=== Other subtypes ===
- Addiction shaming
- Age shaming
- Bottom shaming
- Genuine shame: is associated with genuine dishonor, disgrace, or condemnation.
- False shame: is associated with false condemnation as in the double bind form of false shaming; "he brought what we did to him upon himself". Author and TV personality John Bradshaw calls shame the "emotion that lets us know we are finite".
- Fat shaming
- Femme shaming
- Food shaming
- Secret shame: describes the idea of being ashamed to be ashamed, so causing ashamed people to keep their shame a secret. Psychiatrist James Gilligan discovered, while working as a prison psychiatrist, that violence is primarily caused by secret shame. Gilligan stated, "...so intense and so painful that it threatens to overwhelm him and bring about the death of the self, cause him to lose his mind, his soul, or his sacred honor"
- Internalized shame: Internalization of shame was first coined by Gershen Kaufman. In contrast to an acute short-lived experience of shame, internalized shame reflects deep-seated beliefs of inadequacy that feel permanent and irreversible and are accompanied by words, voices, and images. Internalized shame stems from chronic or less frequent severe experiences of shame occurring with prior trauma or in childhood. It can take over a child's emotions and identity and continue into adulthood or may gradually increase over time. Once internalized, the original shaming event(s) and beliefs need not be recalled nor be conscious. Later experiences of shame are intensified and last longer. They do not require an external event or another person to trigger associated feelings and thoughts and can cause depression and feelings of hopelessness and despair. It also causes "shame anxiety," which makes people apprehensive about experiencing shame.
- Identity shaming
- Kink shaming
- Online shaming
- Sexual shame due to Involuntary celibacy
- Slut-shaming
- Social media shaming
- Tech shame: describes the shame that employees, particularly younger workers, feel when they have challenges utilizing technology at work.
- Toxic shame: describes false, pathological shame. It was coined by Silvan Tomkins in the early 60s. John Bradshaw states that toxic shame is induced, inside children, by all forms of child abuse. Incest and other forms of child sexual abuse can cause particularly severe toxic shame. Toxic shame often induces what is known as complex trauma in children who cannot cope with toxic shaming as it occurs and who dissociate the shame until it is possible to cope with.
- Vicarious shame: refers to the experience of shame on behalf of another person. Individuals vary in their tendency to experience vicarious shame, which is related to neuroticism and to the tendency to experience personal shame. Extremely shame-prone people might even experience vicarious shame even to an increased degree, in other words: shame on behalf of another person who is already feeling shame on behalf of a third party (or possibly on behalf of the individual proper).
- Victim shaming

== Shame and mental illness ==
=== Narcissism ===
It has been suggested that narcissism in adults is related to defenses against shame and that narcissistic personality disorder is connected to shame as well. According to psychiatrist Glen Gabbard, NPD can be broken down into two subtypes, a grandiose, arrogant, thick-skinned "oblivious" subtype and an easily hurt, oversensitive, ashamed "hypervigilant" subtype. The oblivious subtype presents for admiration, envy, and appreciation a grandiose self that is the antithesis of a weak internalized self which hides in shame, while the hypervigilant subtype neutralizes devaluation by seeing others as unjust abusers.

=== Depression ===
In a meta-analytic review performed in 2011, it was found that there were stronger associations with shame and depression than with guilt and depression. External shame, or a negative view of the self, seen through other people, had larger effect sizes correlated with depression than did internal shame.

=== Posttraumatic Stress Disorder ===
Shame is increasingly recognized as a central affective process in PTSD. Shame appears to exacerbate core PTSD mechanisms by intensifying negative self-concept, promoting experiential avoidance, and reinforcing maladaptive cognitive beliefs involving defectiveness and social devaluation. Some research suggests that shame can be especially problematic for veteran and military samples, interfering with emotion regulation and PTSD symptom improvement. Military values around masculinity and strength may add to shame in these populations for not meeting cultural standards.

== Social aspects ==
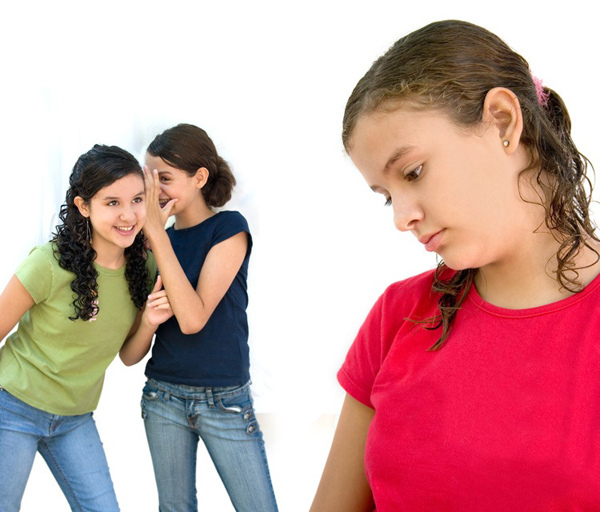
A girl feeling ashamed as two other girls taunt behind her back

According to the anthropologist Ruth Benedict, cultures may be classified by their emphasis on the use of either shame (a shame society) or guilt to regulate the social activities of individuals.

Shame may be used by those people who commit relational aggression and may occur in the workplace as a form of overt social control or aggression. Shaming is used in some societies as a type of punishment, shunning, or ostracism. In this sense, "the real purpose of shaming is not to punish crimes but to create the kind of people who don't commit them".

=== Stigma ===
In 1963, Erving Goffman published Stigma: Notes on the Management of Spoiled Identity. For Goffman, the condition when a particular person is excluded from full societal reception is greatly discrediting. This negative evaluation may be "felt" or "enacted". Thus, stigma can occur when society labels someone as tainted, less desirable, or handicapped. When felt, it refers to the shame associated with having a condition and the fear of being discriminated against... when enacted it refers to actual discrimination of this kind. Shame in relation to stigma studies have most often come from the sense and mental consequences that young adolescents find themselves trapped in when they are deciding to use a condom in STD and/or HIV protection.

The other use of stigma and shame is when someone has a disease, such as cancer, where people look to blame something for their feelings of shame and circumstance of sickness. Jessica M. Sales et al. researched young adolescents ages 15–21 on whether they had used protection in the 14 days prior to coming in for the study. The answers showed implications of shame and stigma, which received an accommodating score. The scores, prior history of STDs, demographics, and psychosocial variables were put into a hierarchical regression model to determine probability of an adolescents chances of using protected sex in the future. The study found that the higher sense of shame and stigma the higher chance the adolescent would use protection in the future. This means that if a person is more aware of consequences, is more in-tune with themselves and the stigma (stereotypes, disgrace, etc.), they will be more likely to protect themselves. The study shows that placing more shame and stigma in the mind of people can be more prone to protecting themselves from the consequences that follow the action of unprotected sex.

HIV-related stigma from those who are born with HIV due to their maternal genetics have a proneness to shame and avoidant coping. David S. Bennett et al. studied the ages 12–24 of self-reported measures of potential risk factors and three domains of internalizing factors: depression, anxiety, and PTSD. The findings suggested that those who had more shame-proneness and more awareness of HIV-stigma had a greater amount of depressive and PTSD symptoms. This means that those who have high HIV-stigma and shame do not seek help from interventions. Rather, they avoid the situation that could cause them to find themselves in a predicament of other mental health issues. Older age was related to greater HIV-related stigma and the female gender was more related to stigma and internalizing symptoms (depression, anxiety, PTSD). Stigma was also associated with greater shame-proneness.

Chapple et al. researched people with lung cancer in regards to the shame and stigma that comes from the disease. The stigma that accompanies lung cancer is most commonly caused by smoking. However, there are many ways to contract lung cancer, therefore those who did not receive lung cancer from smoking often feel shame; blaming themselves for something they did not do. The stigma effects their opinions of themselves, while shame is found to blame other cancer causing factors (tobacco products/anti-tobacco products) or ignoring the disease in avoidant coping altogether. The stigma associated with lung cancer effected relationships of patients with their family members, peers, and physicians who were attempting to provide comfort because the patients felt shame and victimized themselves.

=== Shame campaign ===
A shame campaign is a tactic in which particular individuals are singled out because of their behavior or suspected crimes, often by marking them publicly, such as Hester Prynne in Nathaniel Hawthorne's The Scarlet Letter. In the Philippines, Alfredo Lim popularized such tactics during his term as mayor of Manila. On July 1, 1997, he began a controversial "spray paint shame campaign" in an effort to stop drug use. He and his team sprayed bright red paint on two hundred squatter houses whose residents had been charged, but not yet convicted, of selling prohibited substances. Officials of other municipalities followed suit. Former Senator Rene A. Saguisag condemned Lim's policy. Communists in the 20th century used struggle sessions to handle corruption and other problems.

Public humiliation, historically expressed by confinement in stocks and in other public punishments may occur in social media through viral phenomena.

== Research ==
Psychologists and other researchers who study shame use validated psychometric testing instruments to determine whether or how much a person feels shame. Some of these tools include the Guilt and Shame Proneness (GASP) Scale, the Shame and Stigma Scale (SSS), the Experience of Shame Scale, and the Internalized Shame Scale. Some scales are specific to the person's situation, such as the Weight- and Body-Related Shame and Guilt scale (WEB-SG), the HIV Stigma Scale for people living with HIV and the Cataldo Lung Cancer Stigma Scale (CLCSS) for people with lung cancer. Others are more general, such as the Emotional Reactions and Thoughts Scale, which deals with anxiety, depression, and guilt as well as shame.

=== Treatments ===
There has been little research performed on treatment options concerning shame and people who experience this negative, despairing emotion. Historically, shame was seen as difficult to treat directly, which contributed to the limited number of targeted clinical studies. Different scientific approaches concerning a treatment have been put forward, using components of psychodynamic and cognitive-behavioral precepts. Unfortunately, the effectiveness of these approaches is not known because the studies have not been run or looked at in depth. Recent work, however, has begun to identify shame as a central factor in several psychological disorders, prompting renewed interest in developing evidence-based treatments.

Because shame often involves self-attacking internal dialogues, heightened threat responses, and social withdrawal, effective treatment must focus on altering these self-critical patterns rather than only addressing external behaviors. An example of treatment for shame consists of group-based CBT and Compassion Focused Therapy, which patients report have helped them feel connectedness and encouraged to overcome difficult challenges related to shame. Compassion Focused Therapy (CFT), developed by Paul Gilbert, specifically targets shame by cultivating self-compassion, reducing internalized hostility, and strengthening a sense of safeness and affiliation with others. Group-based CBT and CFT programs have shown early promise in improving emotional regulation and reducing shame-proneness, though larger randomized trials are still needed to determine their long-term effectiveness. Other emerging approaches include mindfulness-based interventions, exposure-based work around shame memories, and integrative therapies that address cultural influences on shame—an area that remains underexplored in clinical research.

==== Empathy ====
Brene Brown explains that shame (using a metaphor of a petri-dish) only needs three things to grow: secrecy, silence, and judgement. Shame cannot grow or thrive, in the context (or supportive environment) of empathy. It is important, that when reaching out for a supportive or empathetic person (i.e. when reaching out to share a story or experience): that we choose the people who have earned the right to hear our story (i.e. someone trustworthy); share with people with whom we have a relationship that can bear the weight of the story.

== See also ==
- Acquiescence
- Badge of shame
- Cognitive dissonance
- Haya (Islam)
- Lady Macbeth effect
- Online shaming
- Psychological projection
- Reintegrative shaming
- Scopophobia
- So You've Been Publicly Shamed, a 2015 book by journalist Jon Ronson about online shaming
