= Internalization =

Internalization may refer to:

- Internalization (sociology)
- Internalization (psychology)
  - Internalizing disorder
- Internalization (biology)
- Internalization theory
  - Internalization (economics)

== See also ==
- Externalization (disambiguation)
