= Tech shame =

Shame about one's technology skills

Tech shame refers to the shame employees feel when experiencing challenges or inability to utilize technology in the workplace. The shame is felt more acutely by Generation Z and younger workers who are presumed to have grown up with technology, and thus be more tech savvy. Younger workers may have experienced digital environments such as social media and video gaming, but these environments may not translate to professional tools, which are often not intuitive.

Tech shame can be addressed through technical training and encouraging a collaborative environment.

The term was coined by HP in November 2022 in a workforce report Hybrid Work: Are We There Yet?.
