= Sexual guilt =

Regrets on intercourse due to cultural expectations

Sexual guilt is a negative emotional response associated with the feeling of anxiety, guilt, or shame in relation to sexual activity. Also known as sexual shame, it is linked with the negative social stigma and cultural expectations that are held towards sex as well as the historical religious opposition of all "immoral" sexual acts. It originates from the negative pressures exerted upon individuals during the course of their lives due to parental and religious teachings concerning sexual activity and expression. Participation in sexual intercourse does not need to occur in order for an individual to experience sexual guilt, however, as self-pleasure and the sexual activities of other people can also induce this feeling. Furthermore, a person who feels guilty or otherwise uncomfortable about sex might also experience sexual guilt.

Sexual guilt can severely impact affected individuals and deteriorate the relationships of those close to them. It has been linked to cases of sexual dysfunction, clinical depression and other mental illnesses. Sexual guilt can also cause physical impacts and illnesses. If the individual feels shame or guilt towards sexual participation they may be less likely to seek protective and contraceptive measures or seek medical attention if they encounter symptoms from sexual intercourse.

Within the modern era of sexual expressiveness and instant sexual gratification, sexual education plays an important role in reducing the impacts and risk of sexual guilt as its incidence increases. Past historical research into the cause of sexual guilt has shown to require more study.

== Causes of sexual guilt ==
Participation in sexual activity or intercourse does not need to take place in order for someone to encounter sexual guilt. Sexual guilt can come from participating in sexual acts, thinking about participating in sexual acts or from critically judging sexual acts and attitudes of yourself or others.

=== Internal ===
Sexual guilt can originate from:

- Feeling guilty about having sexual desires that do not fit within the individual's established set of values or morals.
- Viewing pornography can trigger sexual guilt in individuals who feel guilty or embarrassed about taking part in sexual activity or viewing it.
- Masturbating or self pleasure can be seen as an act that is not moral or dutiful as it serves no procreative purpose and is only an act of self pleasure.
- Having an interest in kinks or sexual acts which are not seen as traditionally 'normal' e.g. BDSM, bondage, anal sex, and many other varieties of sex.

=== Past experiences ===
Studies have suggested that sexual guilt can be a predictor for individuals' past relationships, sexual attitudes and experiences such as

- The individual's first sexual encounter and the loss of virginity.
- Suspicion of, or thoughts of, cheating within a relationship can cause sexual guilt within the individual and their partner.
- Dissatisfaction of sexual intercourse that do not meet the individual's sexual expectations.
  - E.g. a study of hook-up culture in colleges led researchers to find "penetrative sex hookups increased psychological distress for females, but not for males."

=== External influences ===
Sexual guilt can be caused by "messages about approved or disapproved attitudes toward sexual issues" that individuals face from external sources such as family, friends, and religious groups, cultural ‘norms’ or identifying as a non-binary sexual orientation.

- Not identifying under the traditional heterosexual sexual orientation can be highly problematic for individuals within religious groups or cultures whose teachings and beliefs oppose these sexual orientations.
  - This can also cause anxiety and internal conflict as the individual has to "come out" to their family, friends and groups which may not agree with their decision.
    - sexual activity performed outside of wedlock is illegal in some Muslim countries, e.g. Pakistan, Iran, or Morocco.
    - Participation or thoughts within any sexual acts which may be illegal can cause a high degree of sexual guilt. In western countries it is illegal if sex is non consensual sex, incest or the individual is not of the legal age.
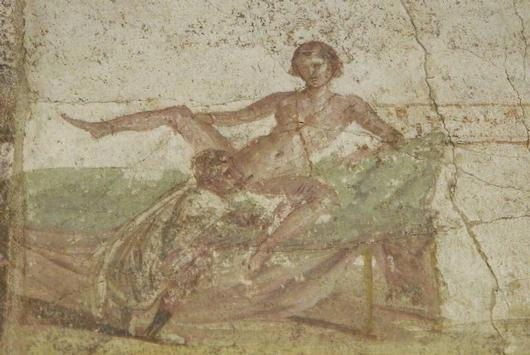
      Image from ancient mural at Pompeii of couple performing oral sex

== Types of sexual guilt ==
There are two main psychologically recognised types of sexual guilt – “latent” guilt and “morning after” guilt. Each type of guilt can be found in different scenarios and can cause different effects upon the individual.

=== Latent guilt ===
Latent guilt is an intrinsic feeling of shame or guilt that comes from the negative association of sexual activity or desire as a base or animal instinct. Individuals with latent guilt may believe that sexual activity shows a weakness that breaks down the individual's strength of character. People who encounter this form of sexual guilt do not have to physically participate in sexual activities to feel it. Individuals can feel shame towards their own inner desire, or they may possess a lowered libido, and/or inability to climax which could impact their relationships.

=== Morning after guilt ===
“Morning after guilt” is derived from the feeling of guilt, sin or shame felt by the individual after they have committed an act that is not in line with their own internal values or within the expectations of people in a relationship or within a certain group, nationality, culture or religion. This type of sexual guilt can most commonly be found within individuals who regret performing an act of sexual activity e.g. cheating within a relationship, partaking in premarital sex, or having sex with someone who the individual regrets performing the action with. As the colloquial name suggests, it is commonly experienced the “morning after”, or post-coitus.

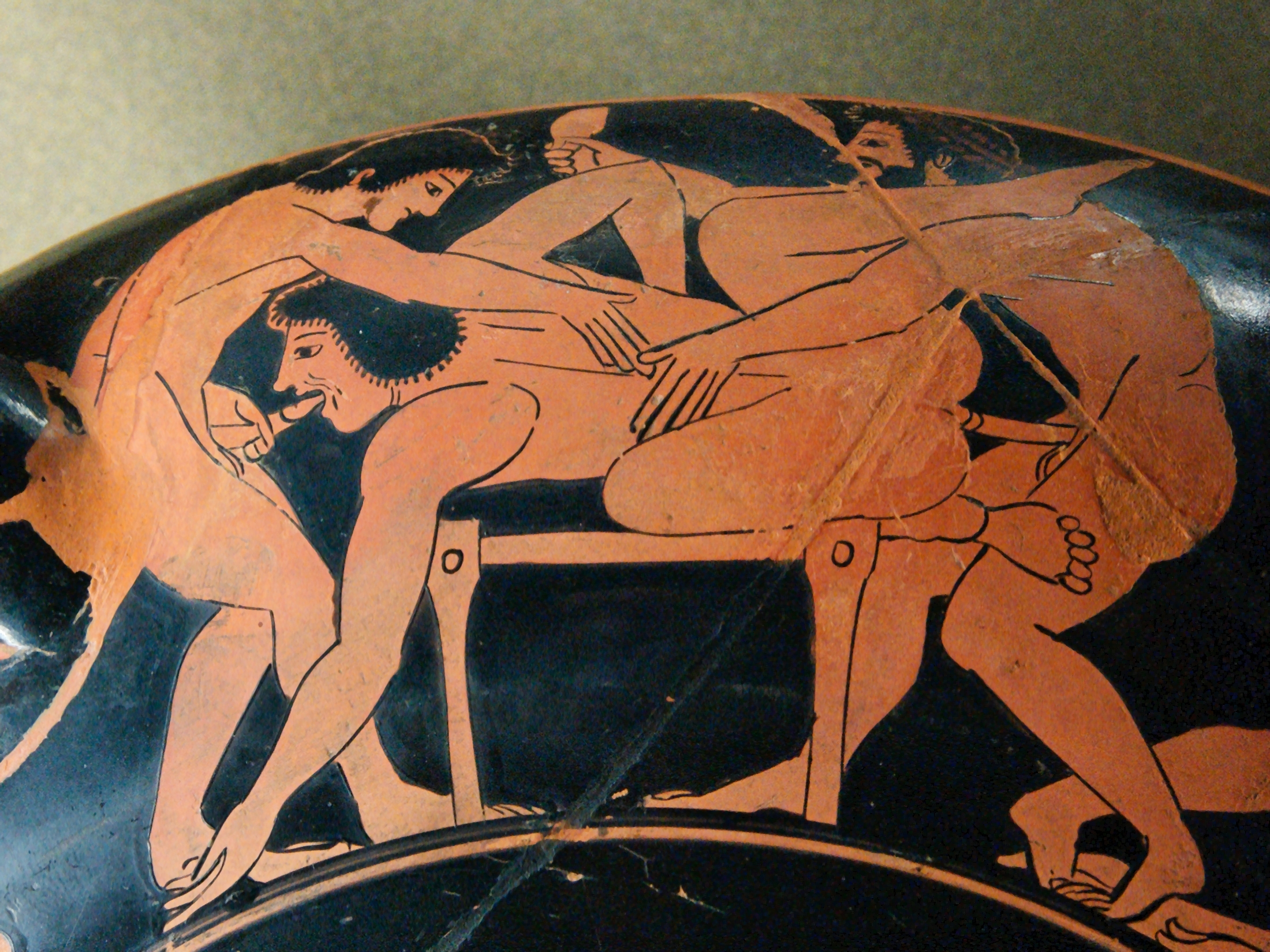
Erotic scene painted scene on pottery in Louvre

=== Involuntary celibacy ===
Sexual guilt or shame can be due to involuntary celibacy.

== Sociocultural impacts ==
Ancient religions and cultures shape how society behaves today. The sexual attitudes of religions in the past can be seen as having an effect upon the sexual attitudes and pressures felt in the modern-day. Each religion looks at sexual activity independently and hold different rules and moral expectations while many have overlapping values and ideas about the role sex should play.

=== Religion ===
Religious beliefs and writings often set expectations upon people to behave and interact in a certain way. Marriage between a male and female is seen in multiple religions as the only type of relationship in which sexual activity should occur; this can place pressure upon people within non-heterosexual relationships.

The Catholic Church has a traditional view towards sexual activity, teaching followers that such activity should be done within the confines of marriage as a "noble and worthy" act between a man and a woman. The Church considers other sexual acts such as homosexuality and masturbation, as well as the use of contraceptives, to be sinful.

Religions such as Judaism consider restraining from sex to be an immoral act, whereas Islam looks at sex as an act that should be responsibly acted upon through marriage. Sexual pleasure is emphasized within marriage when care and love is present. However, homosexuality is often strictly demonized within these religions, with some believing it should be punishable by death.

Hinduism is a religion that has a strong binding to sexual pleasure, or kama; however, this pleasure is thought to be a responsibility of marriage, and is to be avoided until the age of 25, in favor of virtuous living and intellectual, financial and spiritual development. The Kama Sutra is a text thought to be of sacred religious meaning in relation to sex, though it primarily aims to show the three pillars of Hinduism - dharma, artha and kama. Vatsyayana's text is supposed to signify the significance of sexual activity in relation to the priorities of virtuous living and financial gain, Indra Sinha.

A research paper was done by Mark. P Gunderson and James Leslie McCary in which 373 college students completed a 173 item questionnaire to determine whether sexual guilt or religion was a better indicator of the individuals' "level of sex information obtained, sexual attitudes held and sexual behaviour expressed". They found that

"Sexual guilt is a far better and more powerful predictor of level of sex information obtained, sexual attitudes held, and sexual behaviour expressed than religion. The conclusion is that religion is an intervening variable with sexual guilt such that the more frequently students attend church, the more likely they are to have high sexual guilt which interferes with their sexuality."

=== Cultural impacts ===
Social and cultural attitudes and expectations upon members of their community can be felt by the individual and cause sexual guilt, embarrassment, anxiety or even sexual abstinence. Some of these values and behaviours may have been derived from sexual myths and legends which have amalgamated into societal expectations and social stigmas towards acts and forms of sex.

Sexual orientation and identification is a major cause of sexual guilt, anxiety and feelings of non-inclusivity for people with a non-heterosexual sexual orientation. Each country and territory has its own LGBT laws and rights which are based on the cultural values and beliefs of that region. In some cultures it is illegal to be in a same-sex relationship, which is punishable by imprisonment or death. Some of the laws and rights surrounding sex have been shaped by myths and legends which may support more traditional or spiritual forms of sex. Some myths and art show evidence for the presence of LGBT themes in mythology and ancient cultures.

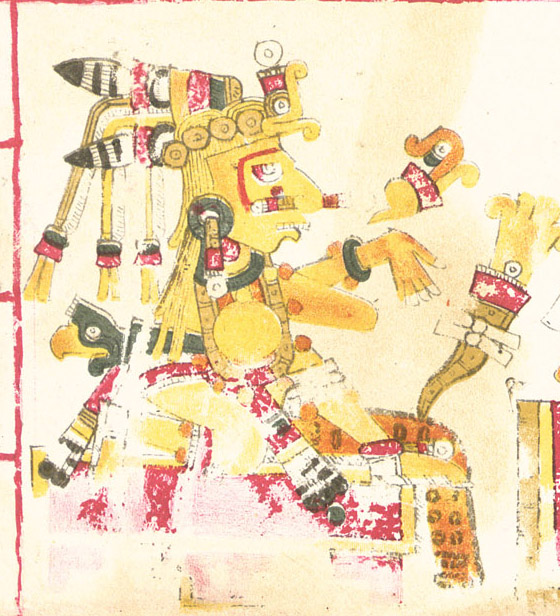
Image of Aztec God of homosexuality Xochipilli.

Research into the effects of sexual myths upon the sexual guilt and levels of sexual activity of college men and women was undertaken by Donald L. Mosher upon 88 anonymous male and female students. It concluded that

"The level of sex experience was not correlated with belief in sex myths. Sex guilt was negatively correlated with level of sex experience and positively correlated with belief in sex myths. High‐sex‐guilt males endorsed myths portraying sex as dangerous, and high‐sex‐guilt females regarded virginity as important. It was concluded that structured sex education and values clarification are needed to complement and amend traditional socialization into hetero‐sexuality."

== Effects of sexual guilt ==
Individuals who experience sexual guilt can experience a range of effects that can have a severe and highly detrimental influence upon their wellbeing, and the health and wellbeing of partners and close relationships. These can be seen as psychological or mentally impacting or have physical manifestations and effects.

=== Psychological effects ===
Individuals who experience sexual guilt or who have experienced sexual guilt previously can be affected mentally by the challenges which this attitude can lead to. Possessing sexual guilt can lead individuals who are sexually active to be hyper aware or critical of their sexual performance which could lead to sexual dysfunction, depression, performance anxiety, and other illnesses. These mental effects can have compounding physical and behavioral impacts such as a fear of sex or loss of sexual desire in which the individual may abstain from sex completely. Individuals who feel a shame towards sexual acts can also be sexually inactive. Sexually inactive individuals can also feel a reluctance, disinterest or anxiety towards sexual acts due to the pressures from religion, media and people around them which can depict sex as a pursuit of the animalistic urges from the id. "People can also feel sexual guilt about the nature of the erotic fantasies"/sexual fantasies. Individuals who have symptoms may require professional psychological advice in order to work through the effects of sexual guilt.

=== Physical effects ===
Sexual guilt may leave the affected individual in a state of crippling anxiety in which they do not want to seek help or practice safe sexual practices. Freud linked the feeling of guilt, and its related emotion of anxiety. People who are less informed or practiced about safe sex practices are more likely to transfer sexually transmitted diseases or be involved in an unwanted pregnancy. Someone suffering from sexual guilt is less likely to seek medical assistance due to a feeling of shame or anxiety, this can then lead to more severe symptoms or infection.
