= Lunch shaming =

Shaming due to school lunch debt

Lunch shaming is a general term referring to when a student is singled out and embarrassed or shamed due to them or their parents not being able to pay for school lunches, or if they have any unpaid lunch debt. Lunch shaming can involve having a marker, like a stamp or wristband, indicating that the child cannot afford a school lunch due to debt or a lack of money, or it can involve being served less expensive cold lunches as opposed to hot lunches.

Lunch shaming is often blamed on the limited meal budgets public schools have to work with in the United States, which would lead many schools to pursue any outstanding debt in order to recoup costs. According to attorney Jessica Webster, "This is a financial transaction between school district and a parent. Kids shouldn't be placed in the middle or ever fear being turned away from the lunch counter."

== History ==
Advocacy against "lunch shaming" first emerged in Minnesota. Beginning in 2008, staff attorney Jessica Webster of Mid-Minnesota Legal Aid documented widespread practices of tray dumping, hand stamping, and meal denial in the state's school districts. In 2013, Webster and Samuel Chu of the national anti-hunger group MAZON testified at the Minnesota Legislature in support of legislation to guarantee meals for all children regardless of debt.

Governor Mark Dayton signed the resulting "School Lunch Aid Act" in 2014, prohibiting schools from demeaning or stigmatizing children for unpaid lunch balances. Minnesota's action is regarded as the first state law addressing lunch shaming, preceding wider national media coverage of the issue beginning in 2015 and subsequent legislation in New Mexico and other states.

== See also ==
- Food shaming
