= Psyche Williams-Forson =

American writer and scholar

Psyche Williams-Forson is an American scholar and writer from Virginia. She is currently the associate professor and chair of American Studies at the University of Maryland.

== Education ==
Williams-Forson, who is African-American, holds a Ph.D. in American Studies from the University of Maryland (completed in 2002), which are also the fields and institutions related to her Master's work in (1994). Additionally, she completed a certificate in Women's Studies (1994). In 1997, she received her bachelor's degree in English and African-American Studies.

== Career and research ==
She primarily focuses on 19th and 20th century U.S. History - specifically social and cultural history dealing with race, gender, material culture, and food.

Currently, Williams-Forson is working on several projects: food shaming and policing, economic availability of rural Virginian black women, African American class through interiors.

She has participated in various interviews. In 2004, she was interviewed by the Mississippi-based Southern Foodways Alliance. The Food and Society Video Project recorded an interview of Williams-Forson's presentation at Institute of Advanced Study Interdisciplinary Symposium (2001) on "How We Talk About Feeding the World." In 2004, MSNBC's Melissa Harris-Perry interviewed her on the interdisciplinary nature of food history - "History of Food, Race, and Identity in America."

== Awards and fellowships ==
- Ford Foundation Postdoctoral Diversity Fellowship
- Foxworth Creative Enterprise Initiative
- Academy for Innovation and Entrepreneurship
- 2023 James Beard Award in Food Issues and Advocacy

== Scholarly work ==
- Taking Food Public: Redefining Foodways in a Changing World (2011) edited with Carole Counihan
- Building Houses out of Chicken Legs: Black Women, Food, & Power (2006)
- "Other Women Cooked for my Husband: Negotiating Gender, Food, and Identities in an African-American/Ghanaian Household." (2010)
- "African Americans and Food Stereotypes." (2009)
- "More Than Just the 'Big Piece of Chicken': The Power of Race, Class, and Food in American Consciousness." (2007)
- "Suckin' the Chicken Bone Dry: African American Women, History, and Food Culture." (2000)
