= 2010 Spanish Labor Reform =

The Reform of Labor Laws in Spain was approved by the Congress of Deputies on September 9, 2010.

The reform of labor laws in Spain had its origin in an executive order of the Government, June 2010, during the second term of José Luis Rodríguez Zapatero as president, and entered into force on June 18 after its publication in the Boletín Oficial del Estado. The executive order was ratified by the Congress of Deputies with 168 votes for (Spanish Socialist Workers' Party), 8 votes against (Esquerra Republicana de Catalunya-Izquierda Unida-Initiative for Catalonia Greens, Bloque Nacionalista Gallego and Nafarroa Bai) and 173 abstentions (People's Party, Convergencia i Unio, Basque Nationalist Party, Coalición Canaria, Union del Pueblo Navarro and Union, Progress and Democracy).

A bill addressing implementation was approved unanimously in spring 2010, first in the Congress, then with amendments in the Senate. The majority of the amendments impacted workers' rights and workplace conditions, and a majority of the amendments were eliminated when the bill was returned to the Congress. The Congress gave final approval on September 9.

The reform represents a modification of the above-mentioned June 18 decree. During the bill's time in the Senate, the PSOE and the PNV concurred on the bill's final form, with input from the Galician Nationalist Bloc (Bloque Nacionalista Gallego, BNG). The PSOE voted in favor, the PNV abstained, and the remaining political groups voted against.

The reform provoked a general strike. One month afterward, one of the labor leaders who had marched at the head of the Madrid protest, Valeriano Gómez, was appointed Labor Minister.

== Main elements of reforms ==
=== Suspension of collective agreement ===
The reform made it possible for employers and workers to suspend collective agreements in case of economic downturn. The aim was to enable companies to reduce employment costs caused by generous sector agreements and help them to adjust costs rather than terminate contracts.

=== Short time working in case of economic downturn ===
The reform introduced the German-style government subsidized short-time working, where companies can reduce the working week and the state unemployment system compensates the affected workers with partial unemployment payments.

=== Personal unemployment insurance fund ===
Creation of a personalized fund based on a number of days per year worked replacing dismissal indemnities and which can be used by the employee in case of loss of work or alternatively to supplement pensions once retired.

=== Reduced attractiveness of temporary contracts ===
Penalization of the use of successive temporary contracts. After 3 years of temporary contracts a company would be obliged to take on the worker on a permanent basis. The compensation payable to workers on temporary contracts was also increased to 12 days per year worked to reduce the gap versus permanent contracts.

=== Reduction of compensation payments for layoffs ===
Reduction from 45 days compensation to 33 days per year worked for all permanent contracts signed from 2011 onwards.

=== Government Fund to cover dismissal indemnities ===
Introduction of an Austrian-inspired system to reduce the cost to employers of dismissing workers while seeking to maintain a high level of employee security (flexisecurity). The government proposed a mutualization of part of the compensation payments due by employers in case of laying off workers.

=== Cheaper dismissals for companies facing losses ===
Easier and cheaper rules for layoffs. Companies facing loses would be entitled to pay reduced compensation of 20 days per year worked rather than the normal 45 days if a company was facing loses.

=== Dismissals for absence ===
In case absenteeism exceeds 2.5% a company could fire a worker who was absent for more than 20% of days in a 2-month period.
