= Externalization =

Externalization may refer to:

- Externalization (migration), efforts by countries to prevent migrants reaching their borders
- Externalization (psychology), Freudian psychology, an unconscious defense mechanism by which an individual projects their own internal characteristics onto the outside world.
  - External memory (psychology)
- Cost externalization, the socioeconomic practice of maximizing profits by off-loading indirect costs and forcing negative effects or externalities to a third party
- Sound externalization, see virtual acoustic space

== See also ==
- External (disambiguation)
- Externalizing disorder
- Internalization (disambiguation)
