= Sammy Forson =

Ghanaian media personality

- Born: Samuel Kofi Arhinful Forson; 14 August 1981; Agona Swedru, Ghana
- Education: Swedru Secondary School; Ghana Institute of Journalism
- Occupations: Broadcast journalist, Radio personality, and DJ
- Years active: 2001–present
- Known for: Joy FM
- Notable work: Weekend City Show, Ignition, and Over drive
- Spouse: Pearl Yahaya Forson

Sammy Forson (born 1984) is a Ghanaian-Zambian media personality, broadcast journalist, DJ, artist manager, Entrepreneur, and Music award judge.

In 2013 he got nominated for ‘Best Music Promoter of the Year‘ category and won at the Ghana DJ Awards for his mid-morning show Lifestyle Cafe on Live 91.9 FM. Sammy Forson won Radio Mid morning host of the 2012 while working at YFM 107.9. After a 3-year stint, he left EIB Network's, Live 91.9 FM in January 2018 and is currently the host of Joy FM's lunch time show popularly known as Ignititon; and Over drive;. Sammy hosts The Weekend City show on Saturday mornings on Joy 99.7 FM. In addition, Sammy Forson was the Business Manager for 15 times Ghana Music Awards winner and 2012 BET Awards winner Sarkodie.

== Early childhood ==
Sammy Forson was born in Agona Swedru in Ghana by Ghanaian parents, moved to Zambia then he relocated to Ghana at age sixteen.

== Education ==
He completed his secondary education at the Swedru Secondary School. He then got admission into the Ghana Institute of Journalism, where he obtained Diploma in Radio Broadcasting and Chartered Institute of Marketing (Ghana).

== Career Life ==
Sammy Forson started his career as a presenter at Garden City Radio in Kumasi, he then moved to handled the Citi Drive and Citi Countdown show at Citi FM (97.3) Ghana. At a point in time, he was a co- host to the Upside Down Show. He quit Citi FM (97.3) Ghana and joined YFM in 2009. He left YFM and joined Live 91.9 FM. In January 2018, he joined Joy FM (a station own and run by the media group company Multimedia Group Limited).

== Awards and nominations ==
| Year | Organisation | Award | Work | Result |
|---|---|---|---|---|
| 2017 | Ghana DJ Awards | Best Male Radio DJ | N/A | Nominated |
| 2016 | People's Celebrity Awards (PCA) | Favourite Male Radio Presenter | N/A | Nominated |
| 2016 | Ghana DJ Awards | Best Male Radio DJ | N/A | Nominated |
| 2013 | Ghana DJ Awards | Best Record Promoter | N/A | Won |
| 2012 | Radio & Television Awards (RTP Awards) | Radio Mid Morning Host of the year | N/A | Won |
