= Reintegrative shaming =

Theory in criminology

In criminology, the reintegrative shaming theory emphasizes the importance of shame in criminal punishment. The theory holds that punishments should focus on the offender's behavior rather than characteristics of the offender. It was developed by Australian criminologist John Braithwaite at Australian National University in 1989. It is related to the emerging perspective of positive criminology, developed by the Israeli criminologist Natti Ronel and his research team.

Shaming includes all forms social processes that in different ways have the aim of remorse in the offender. The theory highlights that the shaming is most efficient when coming from people close to the offender, such as friends and family, and not by authorities or officials. The idea is that the shaming is not stigmatized when aimed at the offense itself rather than the characteristics of the offender.

== See also ==
- Labeling theory
