= Berlin Declaration (2007) =

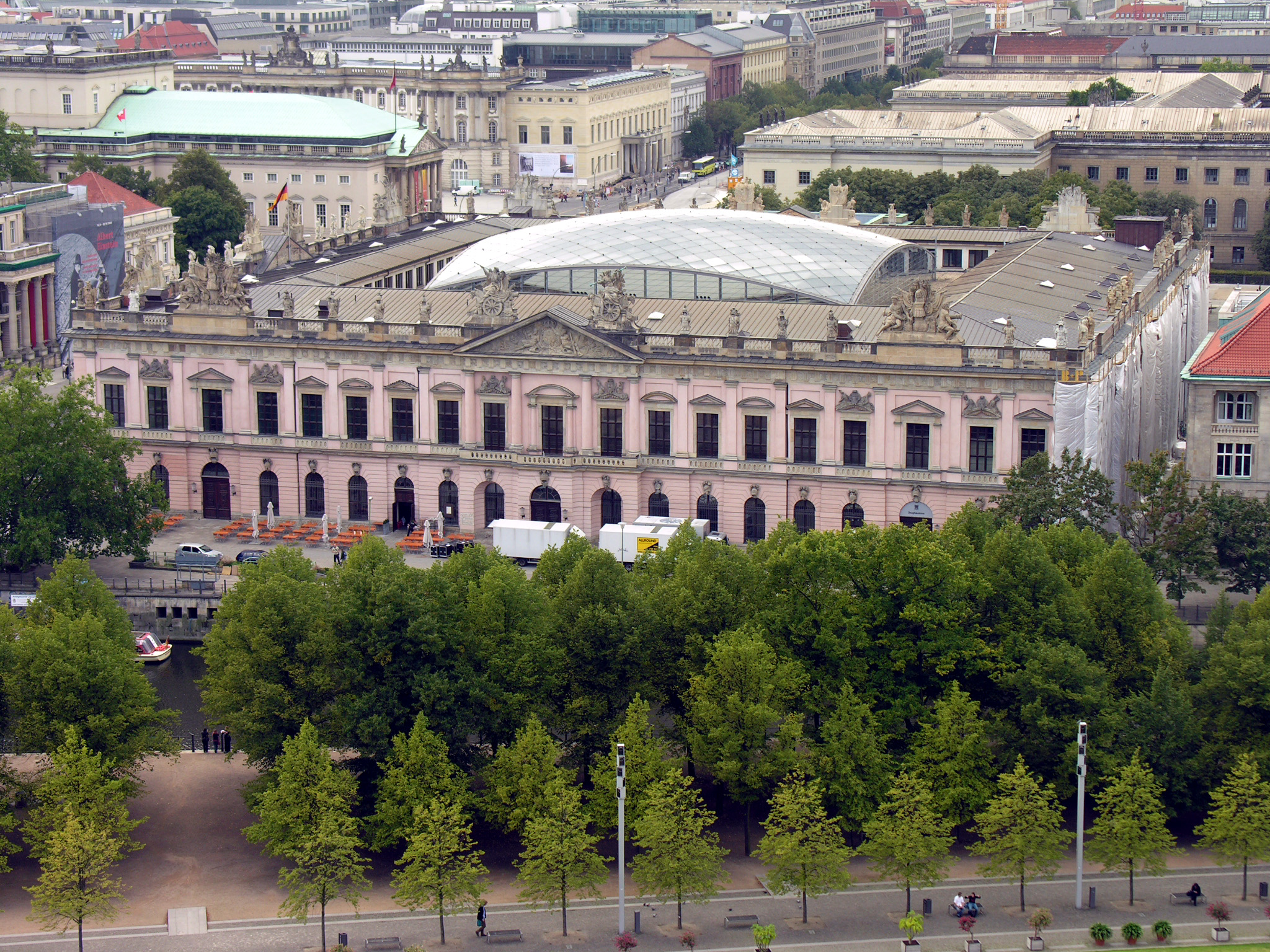
- The Declaration was signed in the Zeughaus of Berlin.
- Created: 25 March 2007
- Signatories: Hans-Gert Pöttering, Angela Merkel and José Manuel Barroso
- Purpose: Reflect over the EU's history and aims, and provide impetus to its reform process

Full text
- Berlin Declaration (2007) at Wikisource

The Berlin Declaration (officially the Declaration on the occasion of the 50th anniversary of the signature of the Treaty of Rome) is a non-binding European Union (EU) text that was signed on 25 March 2007 in Berlin (Germany), celebrating the fiftieth anniversary of the signing of the Treaty of Rome which founded the European Economic Community, the predecessor to the modern EU.

The Declaration was the brainchild of the German Presidency of the Council of the European Union in the first half of 2007. Designed to provide renewed impetus to the process of EU reform after the ratification of the European Constitution had failed, the Declaration aimed for a "renewed common basis" in time for the 2009 European Parliament elections. The German presidency followed up on the issue by brokering a consensus for what later became known as the Treaty of Lisbon.

== Signatories ==
Presented in the name of "We, the citizens of the European Union", it was signed by the Presidents of the three major political institutions;

- Hans-Gert Pöttering as President of the European Parliament.
- Angela Merkel as President of the Council of the European Union (and the European Council).
- José Manuel Barroso as President of the European Commission.

It was originally intended that the leaders of all the member states of the European Union would sign it, though getting a document agreeable to all members proved a challenge, thus it was left to the three institutional heads – though this was met with some criticism.

== Issues ==
=== Christianity ===
The declaration has been criticised by Pope Benedict XVI for not mentioning Christianity. Poland originally threatened to veto it because of this omission but stood down in order for an agreement to be reached. Several secular organizations objected to the proposed inclusion of religion and produced their own declaration called "A Vision for Europe".

=== Translation ===
In the original German (the language the document was drafted in), the phrase "We, the citizens of the European Union, have united for the better" was written as "Wir Bürgerinnen und Bürger der Europäischen Union sind zu unserem Glück vereint." which is in fact closer to "We, the citizens of the European Union, have united in our fortune/happiness". This has been seen as a deliberate political mistranslation.

== See also ==
- Treaties of the European Union
- Treaty establishing a Constitution for Europe
- Treaty of Lisbon
