= Food shaming =

Criticism of a person's food

Food shaming is the action or inaction of subjecting someone to humiliation and criticism for their food. This can include their choice of food, the quality of the food, the source of the food, the caloric/fat/carbohydrate count of the food, or the portion size. Food shaming can be a form of food policing and weight shaming.

Food shaming can be an expression of racism.

== See also ==
- Lunch shaming
