= 2020s in Ireland =

2020s in Irish history refers to significant events in Ireland in the 2020s.

== Government ==
=== Legislative ===
There were three governments of the 33rd Dáil, being coalition governments of Fianna Fáil, Fine Gael and the Green Party. This followed the 2020 general election to Dáil Éireann held on 8 February, and negotiations on a programme for government that lasted till June. The parties agreed on a rotation, with the two major party leaders alternating as Taoiseach. The makeup of the parties resulted in a centre-right coalition. It was the first time that Fianna Fáil and Fine Gael have participated in the same government, which Leo Varadkar described as the end of what has often been referred to as Civil War politics.

The 32nd government of Ireland (27 June 2020 to 17 December 2022) was led by Micheál Martin, leader of Fianna Fáil, as Taoiseach, and Leo Varadkar, leader of Fine Gael, as Tánaiste. It was in office for 2 years, 175 days and ended as planned with the rotation of the office of Taoiseach.

The 33rd government of Ireland (17 December 2022 to 9 April 2024) was led by Varadkar as Taoiseach and Martin as Tánaiste. It lasted 1 year, 114 days. Varadkar resigned as leader of Fine Gael on 20 March 2024 and was succeeded on 24 March by Simon Harris. Varadkar resigned as Taoiseach on 8 April.

The 34th government of Ireland (9 April 2024 to 23 January 2025) was led by Simon Harris as Taoiseach and Martin as Tánaiste. It lasted 289 days. Harris resigned as Taoiseach on 18 December 2024 on the morning of the first meeting of the 34th Dáil after the 2024 general election. Harris and the other members of the government continued to carry out their duties until the appointment of their successors on 23 January 2025.

Dáil constituencies for the 2024 general election

The 2024 Irish general election to elect the 34th Dáil took place on Friday, 29 November 2024, following the dissolution of the 33rd Dáil on 8 November by President Michael D. Higgins at the request of Taoiseach Simon Harris. Polls were open from 7 a.m. to 10 p.m UTC. It elected 174 Teachtaí Dála (TDs) across 43 constituencies of between 3 and 5 seats to Dáil Éireann, the lower house of the Oireachtas, Ireland's legislature. Under the Electoral (Amendment) Act 2023, the number of TDs was increased from 160 to 174, making it the largest Dáil in the history of the state, with an increase in the number of constituencies from 39 to 43. The main issues in the campaign were the cost of living, housing affordability and availability, immigration and asylum management, and economic stability amid external trade uncertainties, reflecting voter concerns despite the country's strong overall financial health.

The election resulted in Fianna Fáil remaining as the largest party, increasing its number of seats to 48. Its governing partner Fine Gael won 38 seats, with the two parties combined winning 86 seats, two shy of a majority. The Green Party, the third party of government, lost all but one of its seats, with only leader Roderic O'Gorman returning to the Dáil. Sinn Féin remained as the second largest party, winning 39 seats, while the Social Democrats and Labour each won 11 seats, an increase of five each.

On 15 January 2025, the formation of a coalition government was agreed between Fianna Fáil, Fine Gael, and nine independents. Micheál Martin was appointed Taoiseach on 23 January 2025.

=== Executive government ===
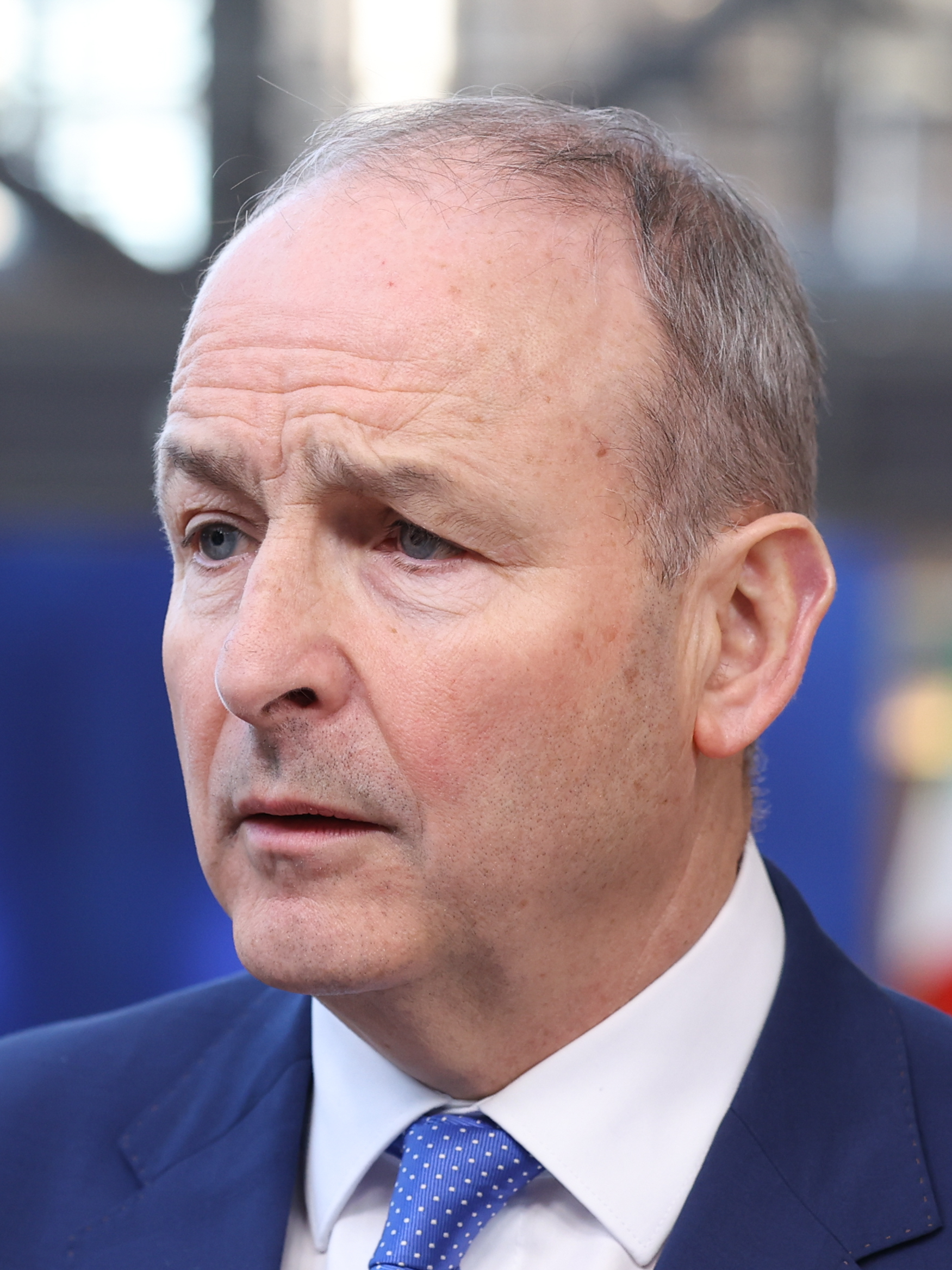
Martin in 2025

Micheál Martin (Irish: [ˈmʲiːçaːl̪ˠ]; born 16 August 1960) is an Irish Fianna Fáil politician serving as Taoiseach since January 2025, having previously held the position from 2020 to 2022. Martin served as Tánaiste, Minister for Foreign Affairs and Minister for Defence from December 2022 to January 2025. He has been leader of Fianna Fáil since January 2011 and a TD for Cork South-Central since 1989. He previously served as Leader of the Opposition from 2011 to 2020 and held various cabinet offices under Bertie Ahern and Brian Cowen.

Born in Cork, Martin initially worked as a teacher before entering politics. He was elected to Cork City Council in 1985, and served as Lord Mayor of Cork from 1992 to 1993. In 1989, he was first elected to Dáil Éireann for Cork South-Central, a seat he has represented ever since. After the victory of Fianna Fáil at the 1997 general election, Taoiseach Bertie Ahern appointed Martin to cabinet as Minister for Education and Science. In 2000, Martin was appointed Minister for Health and Children. In 2004, during his time as Health Minister, Martin introduced a ban on tobacco smoking in all Irish workplaces, making Ireland the first country in the world to introduce a full workplace smoking ban. In the same year, Martin established the Health Service Executive. He served as Minister for Enterprise, Trade and Employment from 2004 to 2008, before being appointed Minister for Foreign Affairs by Ahern's successor, Brian Cowen. In 2009, Martin became the first Irish foreign minister to travel to Latin America, during which time he also made the first official visit to Cuba by any Irish minister. Martin also visited Khartoum during his time as Foreign Minister, following the kidnapping of Sharon Commins and Hilda Kawuki.

In January 2011, Martin resigned as Foreign Minister in protest at Cowen's leadership. Following Cowen's own resignation as leader of Fianna Fáil, Martin was elected to replace him. Weeks later, at the 2011 general election, Martin led Fianna Fáil to the worst result in its 85-year history, with a loss of 57 seats and a popular vote of just 17.4%. He remained in the leadership, becoming Leader of the Opposition. At the 2016 general election, Fianna Fáil's performance improved significantly, more than doubling their representation in the Dáil: Martin continued to serve as Leader of the Opposition.

Martin led his party through the 2020 general election, at which Fianna Fáil becoming the largest party in the Dáil by just one seat. (Note: Sinn Féin and Fianna Fáil each had 37 TDs elected but as Ceann Comhairle Seán Ó Fearghail, a Fianna Fáil member, was automatically returned, this left Fianna Fáil as the largest party in the Dáil.) After lengthy negotiations, he was appointed Taoiseach on 27 June 2020, leading a grand coalition with longtime rival party Fine Gael, marking the first time these two parties had governed together, along with the Green Party. Under the terms of the coalition agreement, Martin served as Taoiseach for the first half of the five-year term, with his predecessor Leo Varadkar as Tánaiste. Martin resigned as Taoiseach on 17 December 2022 to facilitate the appointment of Varadkar to the office.

In the 2024 general election, Fianna Fáil achieved the most seats in the Dáil; Martin was appointed as Taoiseach in January 2025 after a new coalition government was formed.

== See also ==
- Irish government
- 2020s in history
- 2020s in European history
