= Group Embedded Figures Test =

- Purpose: psychological assessment pertaining to field dependence/independence

The Group Embedded Figures Test (GEFT) is a timed psychological assessment consisting of 18 items pertaining to field dependence and field independence. The GEFT was constructed by Herman A Witkin, Philip K. Oltman, Evelyn Raskin, and Stephen A. Karp with the goal to provide an adaptation of the Embedded Figures Test (EFT) for group testing. The EFT was developed by Witkin to assess cognitive style and analytical ability by measuring field dependence and field independence with figures suggested by Kurt Gottschaldt, a German psychologist and influencer of Gestalt psychology and theory. The GEFT measurement places an individual on a spectrum between field dependence and field independence.

The GEFT contains 18 complex figures each in which the respondent must identify a simple form. The respondent does so by tracing the simple form within the complex figure (1) with pencil (for paper-pencil administration) or (2) by clicking and dragging their mouse cursor (for online administration). The GEFT is a timed test elapsing 20-minutes and can be administered to an individual or groups of older children (age 10+), adolescents, and adults. The GEFT is protected by copyright law and is published by Mind Garden, Inc.

The GEFT was validated against the "parent" form of the test, the EFT, and the Rod-and-Frame Test (RFT) administered with the portable apparatus (PRFT). Since Witkin, et al. published the GEFT, other researchers have generated additional data, reporting both higher and lower normative samples.

The GEFT was validated for exclusive administration via paper and pencil until 2014, when an online version was developed by Jack Demick, a research associate at Harvard University and a clinical and developmental psychologist. Since then, a reliability and validity study of the GEFT Online was conducted and showed strong correlation between the paper-and-pencil GEFT and the GEFT Online (r=.78), which is identical to the test-retest reliability for the paper-and-pencil GEFT.
