= Cognitive strategy =

Cognitive strategies are the specific methods that people use to solve problems and/or exploit opportunities, including all sorts of reasoning, planning, arithmetic, etc. Importantly, a cognitive strategy need not be all "in the head", but will almost always interact with various aspects of what might be called the "execution context". A specific cognitive strategy would be implemented via a set of ordered and overlapping logic. Each logical aspect of a cognitive strategy is either taught or learned and needs to be remembered as situation foreknowledge. These cognitive strategies are memorized for future utilization. They can be thought of as consciously written and remembered "programs" or as the "software" that guides future brain-neuron processing. Each logic process helps to "add up" to a specific decision and resulting action.

== Examples ==
A commonly used example of cognitive strategies comes from small-number addition. There are numerous different ways (i.e., different strategies) by which one can get the sum of two one-digit numbers, for example 3+4 (=7). The way that most adults would solve this problem is by simply remembering the answer (a "memory" strategy), but a toddler would probably use one of a number of different finger-counting strategies. For example, one can represent the first addend (3) on one's left hand by raising three fingers, and then do the same with four fingers on the right hand, and then count up the number of fingers that are raised. But there are many other ways to do this. For example, one can do the same first step (raise three fingers on one's left hand), and then start counting from 4 as one raises four more fingers one at a time on either the right hand, or even starting from the fourth finger on the left hand (which would require continuing from 6 on the right hand). Different strategies may have very different characteristics in terms of their time and space complexity, memory requirements, etc., and therefore in terms of their error characteristics.

== See also ==
- Cognition
- Cognitive science
- Cognitive style
- Cognitive styles analysis
