= Field dependence =

Model of variation in cognitive style

Field dependence is a concept in the field of cognitive styles. It is a one-dimensional model of variation in cognitive style. The concept was first proposed by American psychologist Herman Witkin in 1962. Field dependence/independence was the earliest studied area in the study of cognitive styles.

In general, people who exhibit field dependence tend to rely on information provided by the outer world, the field or frame of a situation and their cognition (toward other things) is based on this overall field.

== Measures ==
Field dependence or independence is indicated by the tilting rod and frame test and the tilting room, tilting chair test. The tilt of the frame or room provided a field and the degree of independence from it was shown by the accuracy with which the subject had the experimenter adjust the rod or chair. Their interpretation and the concept of field dependence/independence was initially presented by Witkin and his group in his book Personality Through Perception. As its title suggests, other tests were studied and reported on. A field dependence/independence factor was reported in his later book, Psychological Differentiation.

Later, Witkin and his group developed an Embedded Figure Test and did more work with human development. The EFT figured prominently in Psychological Differentiation. Differentiation was shown by an ability to trace a figure "embedded" within a more complex figure. Field-independent people were generally more differentiated, but differentiation was a broader concept than field dependency.

Witkin's group participated in developing their concepts and were given coauthor credit in their two books. The group included the psychoanalyst Helen Block Lewis, the psychologist Hanna Fatterson, and the experimental psychologist Don Goodenough.

More independently, Witkin wrote a Journal of Abnormal Psychology review of relationships between field dependency/psychological differentiation and types of psychopathology. For example, field-independent people appeared to be more likely to develop delusions while field-dependent people were more likely to have scattered hallucinations.

Educational Testing Service (ETS) produced a Group Embedded Figures Test, suited for testing a classroom of students. It correlated with the EFT to an extent, but was not exactly the same in some correlations. After his work on the books and review, Witkin went to ETS and published some ETS reviews of the thousands of studies related to field dependency/psychological differentiation.

A rating scale was developed for the Draw a Person Test by Witkin's clinicians, described in Psychological Differentiation, and was widely used as another measure of psychological differentiation. In it, greater psychological differentiation was shown by more sophisticated detail, demonstrating more specific identity.

Less differentiated people were usually also more field-dependent and were more inclined to use what Witkin's clinicians in Psychological Differentiation called "massive global repression." Since his experienced clinicians could also recognize field dependence and lack of psychological differentiation upon meeting subjects, however, their conclusion about subjects' use of repression was open to possible contamination.

Their repression hypothesis was more objectively supported for group extremes by studies of "perceptual defense"—the tendency to recognize emotionally significant, disturbing words less easily than more neutral words. Such "defense" had been shown by numerous studies to be correlated with a tendency to repress as shown by measures such as the MMPI.

Those average in Differentiation/Field Independence had been given little specific attention since it was assumed they would simply be intermediate in repression.

In their perceptual defense, however, they were not intermediate. People who were average (statistically "normal") were more able to recognize words if they were emotionally significant. That was defended as making more sense in evolutionary/survival terms. (Minard, et al. in various publications). It seems reasonable to suppose that average ("normal") subjects can confuse the results of a study that includes them without recognizing their particular contribution.

=== Rod and frame test (RFT) ===
To be more specific, in the RFT, examinees are required to sit in a completely dark room without reflecting surfaces where a 3.5 foot luminous square frame with one inch wide sides contains a rod much like one of the sides. The test is properly given after brief (120-second) dark adaptation and the large glowing RFT is seven feet from the subject so it is a dramatic visual display filling much of the visual field. If the test is given with insufficient dark adaptation, many subjects will see the luminous stimulus disappear or fragment when they fixate it visually and a large proportion of them will not happen to report that. The test's validity then is not known. Hebb and others have written about the fragmentation phenomenon.

The RFT is presented with the tilt of rod and tilt of frame in every possible order (RR, LL, RL, LR). The examinee is then asked to tell the examiner how to adjust the rod to "straight up and down like the flagpole outside." Scores are based the number of degrees away from 90.

A less commonly used task was the tilting-room-tilting-chair test, which was similar to the RFT but involved rotating the participant in a chair within a room that also rotated.

=== Embedded figures test (EFT) ===
Examinees are shown a simple geometric figure and then asked to find the simple figure embedded or hidden in a relatively complex figure. Examinees may circle the figure and are scored based on identifying the full, correct figure. The underlying cognitive style theory is that field-independent people can better ignore the influence of the background image and find the hidden figure, while field-dependent people will find it harder to ignore the irrelevant field and will be slower to locate the figure. The Witkin EFT was first developed by Herman Witkin as suggested by the figures of Kurt Gotschaldt and described in his book Psychological Differentiation by Witkin's group. Thurston had an earlier Hidden Figures Test which correlated with the EFT but had a different pattern of other correlations.

Researchers since Witkin's group have extended the use of this measure to other concepts, including components of memory and logic.

== See also ==
- Bottom-up and top-down approaches
- Global precedence
- Weak coherence theory
