= Meyer Reinhold =

American historian (1909–2002)

Meyer Reinhold (September 1, 1909 – 1 July 2002) was an American classical scholar and also a specialist in Jewish studies. He was co-author or editor of 23 books. With his wife Diane he had two children, Helen Reinhold Barrett, later Dean of the Graduate School at Tennessee State University, and, Robert Reinhold, who, until his premature death in 1997, was a reporter for the New York Times and the Los Angeles Times.

== Life ==
Meyer Reinhold was born on September 1, 1909, in Brooklyn to Jewish immigrants from the eastern part of the Austro-Hungarian Empire. He attended the local Bushwick High School in where, on reading Virgil 's Aeneid, he fell in love with classical literature. Reinhold went to City College where he obtained his bachelor's degree in 1929, and then attended Columbia University, where, as a Phi Beta Kappa graduate, he earned a Ph.D. in Ancient History in 1933 with a dissertation, supervised by Charles Knapp on Marcus Agrippa. His teacher William Linn Westermann ranked him among the 3 best students he had ever trained, the other two being Moses Finkelstein and Naphtali Lewis, all three of whom took together a spring course on the Zenon papyri under Westerman in 1932. All three were to fall victim to McCarthyism in the 1950s, and have their scholarly careers interrupted.

His biography of Agrippa was published that same year, and became the standard work on the subject. Following his attendance at Columbia, he spent two years at the American Academy in Rome as a fellow, during which time he travelled widely in Italy and Greece.

He began as a teacher at Brooklyn College, rose to the position of instructor in classics in 1938. He married Diane Roth, to whom he had been introduced by Moses Finkelstein's wife Mary, on September 29, 1939. He later developed courses for the study of classics in translation for veterans who returned to study after World War II. He was appointed Assistant Professor in 1947 and promoted to associate professor in 1952. In 1946, he published a critique of Michael Rostovtzeff's influential The Social and Economic History of the Roman Empire (1926), not in a scholarly venue, but in Bernhard Stern's Marxist journal Science & Society. Meyer argued that the retroactive imposition of concepts use to analyse the forms of modern industrial economies, with their wage labour and complex financial webs onto classical societies was flawed from the start. Meyer much preferred the approach set out by Gunnar Mickwitz and by Max Weber in his Agrarverhältnisse im Altertum.(1909). Rostovtzeff had modernized antiquity by making it out to be an embryonic form of capitalism, an approach which, he added, reflected the petty bourgeois mentality he discerned in Rostovtzeff's outlook and methods.

At his scholarly prime (46), and one of the foremost young American historians of the history of Rome, he was forced to resign in what was to become the first of 4 'retirements' in 1955, a victim of the McCarthy era after declaring he would not reply to questions about his political views and colleagues. The critique of Rostovtzeff may well have fed erroneous suspicions that Meyer was a Communist: despite the Brooklyn College later apologized, in 1987, for the way he had been treated. For a decade he worked in his brother Louis' firm. Louis ran the Richmond Advertising Services of Brooklyn and gave Meyer a job as vice-president in the agency. Unemployable in the profession for which he had been trained, Meyer continued to conduct his research privately. In 1965, resumed teaching again as professor of Greek, Latin, and ancient history at Southern Illinois University at Carbondale. In 1967, he moved to the University of Missouri to teach classical studies. This is where he became the Byler Distinguished Professor of Classical Studies. On retirement from Missouri in 1980, he was appointed visiting professor at Boston University with emeritus ranking. There he founded the Institute for the Classical Tradition and the International Journal of the Classical Tradition (1991). In 1995, he moved to Nashville where his daughter was an academic and was given a post as visiting professor at Vanderbilt University. He received a nomination for a Presidential Medal in the Humanities in 1998. In addition to works of classical scholarship, Reinhold published works on Jewish history, notably Diaspora: The Jews Among The Greeks And Romans, (1983) and with Louis Feldman co-edited Jewish Life and Thought Among Greeks And Romans; Primary Readings,(1996).

Meyer Reinhold died in July 2002.

== Works ==
- Roman Civilization: Selected Readings, Vol. 2, The Empire (co-editor Naphtali Lewis) Columbia University Press; 3rd edition (1990), ISBN 0231071337
- Roman Civilization: The Republic and the Augustan Age, Selected Readings, Volume 1, ISBN 0231070543
- Essentials of Greek and Roman Classics: A Guide to the Humanities
- Classics Greek & Roman
- Past And Present: The Continuity of Classical Myth
- Classical Drama, Greek and Roman
- The Golden Age of Augustus (Aspects of Antiquity)
- Studies in Classical History and Society (American Classical Studies)
- From Republic To Principate: An Historical Commentary On Cassius Dio's Roman History Volume 6: Books 49-52 (36-29 B.C.) (American Philological Association Philological Monographs) (1988), Scholars Press, ISBN 1555402461
- Classica Americana : the Greek and Roman heritage in the United States (1984), Wayne State University Press, ISBN 0814317448
- Classick Pages: Classical Reading of Eighteenth-century Americans (1975)
- Barron's Simplified Approach to Plato & Aristotle
- Essentials of the Greek and Roman Classics
- History of purple as a status symbol in antiquity (Collection Latomus)
- The Quest for Classical Drama Greek and Roman
- The Quest for "Useful Knowledge" in Eighteenth-Century America
- A simplified approach to Plato & Aristotle
- Marcus Agrippa : a biography, Geneva, New York: The W. F. Humphreys Press, 1932 (Reprinted 1965,1981)
- Barron's Simplified Approach to the Odyssey of Homer
- Barron's simplified approach to ten Greek tragedies
- Golden Age Augustus (Aspects of Antiquity)
- Barron's simplified approach to Vergil: Eclogues, Georgics, Aeneid
