= Guilt trip =

Emotional response of guilt as intended by someone else

A guilt trip is the experience of guilt due to another person's communication that leads to the emotional response. Guilt tripping, causing a guilt trip, is a form of emotional blackmail that is often intended to manipulate a person by preying on their feelings of guilt or responsibility. It is considered by many to be a toxic behavior that affects a person's well-being and relationships.

There are limited studies examining the guilt trip, mostly focused on parent–child relationships. George K. Simon interprets the guilt trip as a special kind of intimidation tactic. A manipulator suggests to the conscientious victim that they do not care enough, are too selfish or have it easy. This usually results in the victim feeling bad, keeping them in a self-doubting, anxious and submissive position. Some consider guilt tripping a person to be a form of punishment for a perceived transgression.

Some authors consider that inducing guilt is not always wrong as it can facilitate a wrongdoer's moral development.

== See also ==
- Codependency
- Destabilisation
- Gaslighting
- Guiltive
- Mind games
- Presumption of guilt
