= Spirit rescue =

Spirit Rescue relates to the practice within Spiritualism of assisting spirit entities who are believed to have failed to make the transition into the afterlife. They are therefore considered by Spiritualists to remain within our physical dimension in a wandering or lost state. The usual causes of this are purported to be sudden or traumatic death, guilt, fear of punishment, restrictive religious beliefs and other emotional conditions that may limit a person's focus and prevent a successful transition.

Spirit Rescue is sometimes performed by a Spiritualist medium and sometimes by medical doctors as an effective form of psychotherapy in certain cases. They have occasionally successfully communicated with discarnate spirits who have influenced the physical and/or emotional conditions under treatment. In those cases, after the spirit(s) have left the body of the patient, there is often a complete recovery of the patient. As to the spirits, after explaining their condition to them, exploring whatever it is that holds them within the earthly dimension of existence, they move on.

Many of these spirits are considered to display a reduced degree of awareness and consciousness compared to normal human consciousness, and it is a common belief among Spiritualists and some medical professionals that the spirit may not even realize they have died, especially as they may exist within a projected reality of their own making, a mental construct conforming to their expectations and emotions. This is allegedly much like a mental construct from which the therapist may attempt to move the spirit into a higher consciousness. The essence of rescue work appears to be reaching earthbound spirit and attempting to raise their conscious awareness to include other options of reality.

A common rescue method involves employing hypnotherapy whereby the patient is placed in a state akin to a trance. thereby allowing the therapist to speak directly with the spirit or spirits.

Dr. Alan Sanderson, M.D. records cases successfully treated by him in this manner in his monograph: The Case for Spirit Release (2003).

== Skeptical views ==
The use of spirit rescue and spiritual release therapy remain controversial within the medical community. Considered by many to be a complementary or alternative practice. Practitioners sometimes use diagnoses which are not recognized within the mainline of psychiatric practice.
