= Naphtali Lewis =

American papyrologist (1911–2005)

- Born: 14 December 1911; New York, United States
- Died: 11 September 2005 (aged 93)
- Education: Columbia University (MA)
- Spouse(s): Helen (died 1987) Ruth Markel (died 2004)
- Children: Judith and John

Naphtali Lewis (14 December 1911 – 11 September 2005) was an American papyrologist who published extensively on subjects ranging from the ancient papyrus industry to government in Roman Egypt. He also wrote several social histories of Ptolemaic and Roman Egypt to make his research more accessible to non-specialists. He was married to the psychoanalyst Helen Lewis, and they had two children, John Block Lewis and Judith Herman, a physician who followed in her mother's professional footsteps.

== Early Studies ==
Lewis did his undergraduate studies in classical languages and French at City College of New York (AB, magna cum laude 1930) and earned an MA at Columbia (1932). He generally found the lectures rather mechanical but his curiosity in what was to become the object of a lifelong research interest was stirred where he did course work in his final year, when he read, together with Meyer Reinhold and Moses Finkelstein, the Zenon papyri under the direction of William Westermann.

== Europe, 1933–1936 ==
Lewis pursued further postgraduate studies in Europe with a fellowship from the American Field Service. After receiving a certificate at the University of Strasbourg (1933), he went to Paris where he pursued his studies on papyrology under Paul Collart, and more generally, trained as an historian under Gustave Glotz. His first work, a doctoral thesis in French, was L'industrie du papyrus dans l'Égypte gréco-romaine (Paris, 1934), a study of the papyrus plant and how it was manufactured and used for writing. He published an English version of his thesis much later in 1974 under the title Papyrus in Classical Antiquity. He spoke French fluently but with a Bronx accent.

He then moved to Rome and furthered his research for 2 years at the American Academy in Rome, working on the Fouad papyri. He also managed to travel widely at this time, visiting the Mediterranean, travelling through the Levant and Palestine and sojourning in Istanbul and Athens.

== Return to the United States ==
On returning to the United States, where the effects of the Great Depression made employment difficult, he did odd jobs and filled part-time posts until, in 1938, Casper Kraemer managed to get him a post at New York University on the recommendation that he conduct research on the Karanis papyri. There he made a lifelong friendship with Lionel Casson. When World War 2 broke out he became a translator for the Engineer Corps, and later head of war research at Columbia University.

== Postwar Period ==
From 1947 until 1976, Lewis taught at Brooklyn College (whence he retired as Distinguished Professor) and was also involved in the City University's Graduate School. He served as president of the American Society of Papyrologists (1965–1969) and as president of the Association Internationale de Papyrologues (1974–1983). His wife was summoned in 1953 to be interrogated during the Second Red Scare to respond to interrogations about possible Communist connections, but refused to answer, pleading the Fifth Amendment.

After his wife's death in 1987, Lewis suffered a heart attack, but on regaining his health married Ruth Markel, who was to predecease him, dying in 2004. In retirement, he continued to conduct research and publish, and also taught papyrology and ancient history as a visiting professor at the University of California, Santa Barbara.

== Selected works ==
- Judaean Desert Studies: The Documents from the Bar-Kokhba Period in the Cave of Letters: Greek Papyri, Israel Exploration Society (1989)
- Greeks in Ptolemaic Egypt : Case Studies in the Social History of the Hellenistic World, Oxford University Press (1986), ISBN 0-19-814867-4
- The Interpretation of Dreams & Portents in Antiquity, Bolchazy-Carducci (c1996), ISBN 0-86516-256-5
- Life in Egypt Under Roman Rule, Oxford University Press (1983), ISBN 0-19-814848-8
- Papyrus in Classical Antiquity, Clarendon Press (1974), ISBN 0-19-814803-8
- Roman Civilization: Selected Readings: The Republic and the Augustan Age (Volume 1), Columbia University Press (1951), ISBN 0-231-07131-0
- Roman Civilization: Selected Readings: The Empire (Volume 2), Columbia University Press (1955), ISBN 9780231071321

== Full Bibliography ==
- Ralph Keen, "Naphtali Lewis: Bibliography," Bulletin of the American Society of Papyrologists, 15 (1978) 2–8.
