= Lies (evidence) =

A lie is a statement used intentionally for the purpose of deception. The practice of communicating a lie is called lying; a person who communicates a lie may be termed a liar. Lies may be employed to serve a variety of instrumental, interpersonal, or psychological functions for the individuals who use them. Generally, the term "lie" carries a negative connotation and, depending on the context, a person who communicates a lie may be subject to social, legal, religious, or criminal sanctions.

== England and Wales ==
In England, if the prosecution seeks to rely on the fact the defendant lied (to police, for example), it is sometimes necessary for the judge to give the jury what is known as a Lucas direction.

A Lucas direction is not used where the prosecution attempts to show the defendant committed the crime, and, if the jury finds the defendant guilty, this would mean the defendant had lied. The direction "comes into play when the prosecution says, or the judge envisages that the jury may say, that the lie is evidence against the accused, in effect using it as an implied admission of guilt .... this is quite distinct from the run of the mill case in which the defence case is contradicted by the evidence of the prosecution witnesses in such a way as to make it necessary for the prosecution to say ... that the defendant's account is untrue and indeed deliberately and knowingly false". It is appropriate for a judge to give a Lucas direction:

1. Where the defence relies on an alibi (see also R v Harron [1996] 2 Cr App R 457, R v Lesley [1996] 1 Cr App R 39 and R v Peacock [1998] Crim LR 681. But not necessarily in every such case—see R v Patrick [1999] 6 Archbold News 3.)
2. Where the judge considers it desirable or necessary to suggest that the jury should look for support or corroboration of one piece of evidence in the case, and amongst that other evidence draws attention to lies told, or allegedly told, by the defendant.
3. Where the prosecution seeks to show that something said, either in or out of the court, in relation to a separate and distinct issue was a lie, and to rely on that lie as evidence of guilt in relation to the charge which is sought to be proved.
4. Where although the prosecution has not adopted the approach (in (iii) above) the judge reasonably envisages that there is a real danger that the jury may do so.

A Lucas direction has three parts:

- The judge must tell the jury the lie is only evidence of guilt if they are satisfied the lie was made deliberately.
- The judge must remind the jury that people might lie not because they are guilty, but for other reasons (for example, to bolster a weak case, to protect someone, out of panic, or to cover up disgraceful behaviour).
- The judge must tell the jury that because the lie alone is insufficient evidence, they should not rely solely on the lie but should also look to the other evidence to corroborate guilt.

== See also ==
- Consciousness of guilt
- Dishonesty
- Perjury
