= Innovation skill =

Innovation skills are practically the types of skills that allow individuals to become innovative in what they do. These are usually a combination of cognitive skills (e.g. the ability to think creatively and critically), behavioural skills (e.g. the ability to solve problems, to manage risk), functional skills (e.g. basic skills such as writing, reading and numeracy) and technical skills (e.g. research techniques, project management, or IT engineering).

== See also ==
- Innovation
- Cognitive style
- Behavior
- Skill
- Learning
- Benjamin Bloom
