= Measures of guilt and shame =

Measures of guilt and shame are used by mental health professionals to determine an individual's propensity towards the self-conscious feelings of guilt or shame.

Guilt and shame are both negative social and moral emotions as well as behavioral regulators, yet they differ in their perceived causes and motivations: external sources cause shame which affects ego and self-image, whereas guilt is self-originating and focuses on how others are impacted.

Measures of shame and guilt are useful for understanding individuals' reactions to embarrassing and regrettable situations in psychotherapy and psychopathology. Some of the most commonly used measures are Harder's Personal Feelings Questionnaire-2 (PFQ-2), introduced in 1990, Self-Conscious Affect and Attribution Inventory (SCAAI), Test of Self-Conscious Affect (TOSCA), and the more recently introduced Guilt and Shame Proneness Scale (GASP).

== Methods ==
Measures of guilt and shame are typically a self-report survey that provides examples of feelings of guilt and shame, or scenarios in which a person might experience one of those feelings. The respondents are usually required to indicate, using a numbered scale, the likelihood they would experience each emotional response. In some cases responses are instead multiple choice.

These methods do not require the respondent to formulate or give definitions guilt or shame, and prevent discrepancies that might arise from individual's varied definitions. Differences in the classifications of guilt and shame can and do occur across different measures, however, and can be seen when multiple measures give slightly differing results for the same subject.

== Measures ==
=== Guilt and Shame Proneness Scale ===
The GASP is a relatively new measure of guilt and shame developed by Taya R. Cohen that takes a different approach to the classifications of these emotions. The self-report test assesses guilt-proneness and shame-proneness rather than just the presence of the feelings.

The test is unique for its subclassifications of guilt and shame into: guilt-negative-behavior-evaluation (NBE), guilt-repair, shame-negative-self-evaluation (NSE), and shame-withdraw. There are 16 items on the questionnaire, four for each sub classification. Each item is a short description of an everyday embarrassing scenario or transgression; the respondent is asked to imagine they are in that situation and then indicate how likely it is that their experience would match the described through a 1–7 scale, "1" meaning "very unlikely" and "7" meaning "very likely". The scenarios are varied to include workplace failures, petty crime, social faux pas, among others. Research conducted using the GASP showed that it could reliably measure guilt-proneness and shame-proneness, and that guilt proneness was correlated to healthy prosocial behaviors, while shame was correlated with more unhealthy antisocial behavior.

The GASP has an advantage over existing measures of guilt and shame for its ability to test for different types of guilt and shame, especially the ability to distinguish NSE from withdrawal in shame, where there is commonly uncertainty in tests such as the TOSCA. This test is potentially useful in predicting undesirable behavior in individuals by evaluating their dispositions towards the sub types of reactions rather than just their tendency toward either feeling guilt or shame.

=== Personal Feelings Questionnaire-2 ===
An expanded version of D. W. Harder's original PFQ developed in 1987, the PFQ-2 is a self-response questionnaire consisting of adjectives and statements that describe either shame or guilt. The adjectives and statements are ranked on a 5-point scale, a "0" response meaning the individual does not experience the emotion and a "4" meaning that they experience it very strongly.

The questionnaire has been used to show correlations between guilt and shame, attachment styles, and the "Big Five" personality traits: Neuroticism, Extraversion, Openness to experience, Agreeableness and Conscientiousness. The measure was used in conjunction with other self-report measures of personality and attachment in research which concluded that guilt and shame have significant correlations to "broad, enduring personality constructs".

=== Self-Conscious Affect and Attribution Inventory ===
Presented in 1990, the SCAAI was developed specifically for young adult populations, offering scenarios that college-age individuals might typically encounter and providing four possible responses to each scenario. The responses correlate to guilt, shame, externalization of blame, and detachment. The measure was one of the first to use scenario-based responses, as opposed to the more commonly used adjective response styles.

Through testing, the SCAAI was determined reliable over the four sub scales of shame, guilt, externalization and detachment; the pride sub scales had much lower reliability and are thus not considered one of main uses of the measure. Tests using the SCAAI found the shame and guilt sub scales to be positively intercorrelated, allowing researchers to conclude that the two sub scales are highly related but functionally different.

=== Test of Self-Conscious Affect ===
Originally modeled after the SCAAI, the current version of the TOSCA, the TOSCA-3 is the most commonly used measure of guilt and shame today. The TOSCA-3 measures guilt and shame proneness through a series of 16 scenarios developed from descriptions of real personal experiences of guilt, shame, and pride, including several positive scenarios. The test is of a multiple choice response format, offering four responses to each of the 16 scenarios, where each choice is rated on a 5-point scale, a "1" rating meaning "not likely" and a "5" rating meaning "very likely".

The validity of the TOSCA has been supported through research on guilt and shame proneness as a risk factor for psychological maladjustment. However, the TOSCA has been criticized for being overly simplistic in judging guilt as a healthier, more prosocial response than shame, for problems distinguishing guilt and shame, and for attempting to measure personality dispositions through a test of specific scenarios. Though typically used to measure the trait emotions of guilt and shame, the TOSCA has been found to be a good predictor of tendency towards guilt-related and motivated behaviors or shame-related emotions; the test was not able to distinguish the tendency to feel either emotion, which is important in determining risks for related psychological issues such as depression, low self-esteem, etc.

== Uses ==
Guilt and shame are key motivators to moral action and highly affect how a person responds to emotional stimuli. And individual's proneness to feel guilt or shame and their proneness to act according to one of them have implications for emotional stability and interpersonal tendencies. Motivations for moral actions can be give insight into how an individual perceives themselves and negative situations, which may be valuable information in psychotherapy, workplaces, schools, and many other environments yet to be explored in this context.

The TOSCA has shown links between shame-proneness and depression, anxiety, and low self-esteem. As such, researchers using the TOSCA have concluded that "it may be useful for clinicians to pay attention to a client's propensity to feel shame and their tendency to externalize blame as indicators of risk for psychological maladjustment". The TOSCA and SCAAI have both been used in studies concerning the relationship between feelings of guilt/shame and anger/aggression, which found that shame is positively related to anger, suspiciousness, and hostility while guilt was negatively related to anger. This finding supports that guilt is the more pro-social emotional response and also opens new areas of interest in studies of anger and violence. Shame scales in studies using the TOSCA and PFQ-2 have shown correlation to a multitude of aspects of psychopathology, but have also shown enough overlap with the guilt scales that there is potential for more research in this area.

In addition, recent research by Mintz, Etengoff & Grysman in the Journal of Child and Family Studies linked retrospective reports of parenting behaviors to emerging adults' reports of shame and guilt as measured by the TOSCA.

== See also ==
- Consciousness of guilt
- Guilt–shame–fear spectrum of cultures
- Guilt (emotion)
- Shame
