= Guiltive =

Emotional Experience

The guiltive is a term introduced by linguist John Haiman for the speaker attitude whereby the speaker overtly presents themself as generous or indifferent but actually means the opposite of what they are saying, with the intention of making the addressee feel guilty.

The guiltive is similar to sarcasm: in both, the speaker's ostensible message is accompanied by a derived metamessage "This message is bogus." In sarcasm this is overtly marked by the speaker (for example, using intonation or caricatured formality), whereas in the guiltive, it is instead "left to be supplied by the addressee, who is thereby made to feel like a worm." The fact that the speaker still sounds sincere (albeit known not to be) suggests an affinity with polite language. But unlike politeness, the purpose of which is to avoid aggression, the guiltive is a form of passive-aggressiveness intended to make the listener feel bad.

The name "guiltive" is formed with the -ive suffix, which is commonly used for the names of grammatical moods. But as with sarcasm, no language has been found to have grammaticalized it.

== Bibliography ==
- Bybee, Joan L.; Fleischman, Suzanne (1995). "Introduction". Modality in grammar and discourse. Typological studies in language, v. 32. Amsterdam; Philadelphia: JBenjamins. pp. 1–14. ISBN 978-1-55619-639-3.
- Haiman, John (1995). "Moods and MetaMessages. Alieanation as a Mood". In Bybee, Joan L.; Fleischman, Suzanne (eds.). Modality in grammar and discourse. Typological studies in language, v. 32. Amsterdam; Philadelphia: JBenjamins. pp. 329–344. ISBN 978-1-55619-639-3.
- Haiman, John (1998). "Sarcasm and its neighbors". Talk is cheap : sarcasm, alienation, and the evolution of language. Oxford: Oxford University Press. ISBN 978-0-19-511524-6. Contains an abridged version of (Haiman 1995).
- Haspelmath, Martin (1998). "Review of Modality in Grammar and Discourse, ed. by Joan Bybee and Suzanne Fleischman". Linguistic Typology. 2 (1): 125–139. doi:10.1515/lity.1998.2.1.125.
