= Consciousness of guilt =

Legal evidence of a guilty conscience

In the law of evidence, consciousness of guilt is a type of circumstantial evidence that judges, prosecutors, and juries may consider when determining whether a defendant is guilty of a criminal offense. It is often admissible evidence, and judges are required to instruct juries on this form of evidence. Conduct such as giving a false alibi, concealing evidence, or fleeing may support an inference of consciousness of guilt. However, such conduct can also have innocent explanations, including fear of wrongful conviction.

== Descriptions and definitions ==
Consciousness of guilt law and legal definition:

Evidentiary rules allow a prosecutor to introduce testimony that tends to show that the defendant's actions prove he knew he was guilty (at least of something). This is sometimes referred to as "consciousness of guilt". For example, such evidence may include actions the defendant took to "cover up" his alleged crime. Flight, when unexplained, may indicate consciousness of guilt if the facts and the circumstances support it. A person's false statements as to (his/her) whereabouts at the time of the offense may tend to show a consciousness of guilt.

Criminal defense attorney Stephen G. Rodriguez describes it thus:

Consciousness of Guilt is both a concept and a type of circumstantial evidence used in criminal trials by prosecutors. It refers to a powerful and highly incriminating inference that a judge or jury may draw from the statements or conduct of a defendant (accused) after a crime has been committed suggesting that the defendant knows he or she is guilty of the charged crime. In other words, the defendant's conduct after the crime is circumstantial (indirect) evidence that the defendant intended to commit the crime, or, in fact, committed the crime.

The New York State Unified Court System discusses false alibis (in the context of "consciousness of guilt") as a form of admissible evidence:

Evidence of post-crime conduct that may in the context of a particular case evince a defendant's consciousness of guilt of the offense with which the defendant is charged is admissible. A consciousness of guilt may, for example, be evinced by a false alibi or explanation for one's actions, intimidation of a witness, destruction or concealment of evidence or flight.

Haim Cohn explains the concept:

First and foremost, there is "guilt" within the meaning of criminal law. On the one hand, guilt is spoken of as denoting the mental element in crime: the guilt of one who committed a criminal act – actus reus – presupposes the criminal mind – mens rea; or, an actus reus is transformed into guilt by the supervenience of mens rea. Whether the mens rea is intent or wilfulness, or only negligence or recklessness, does not affect the incidence of guilt, but may well raise the question of degree of guilt. On the other hand, "guilt" is the result of a verdict to the effect that the accused is criminally responsible ("finding of guilty"), and it is in this sense that the accused may "plead guilty".

== Conduct potentially indicating consciousness of guilt ==
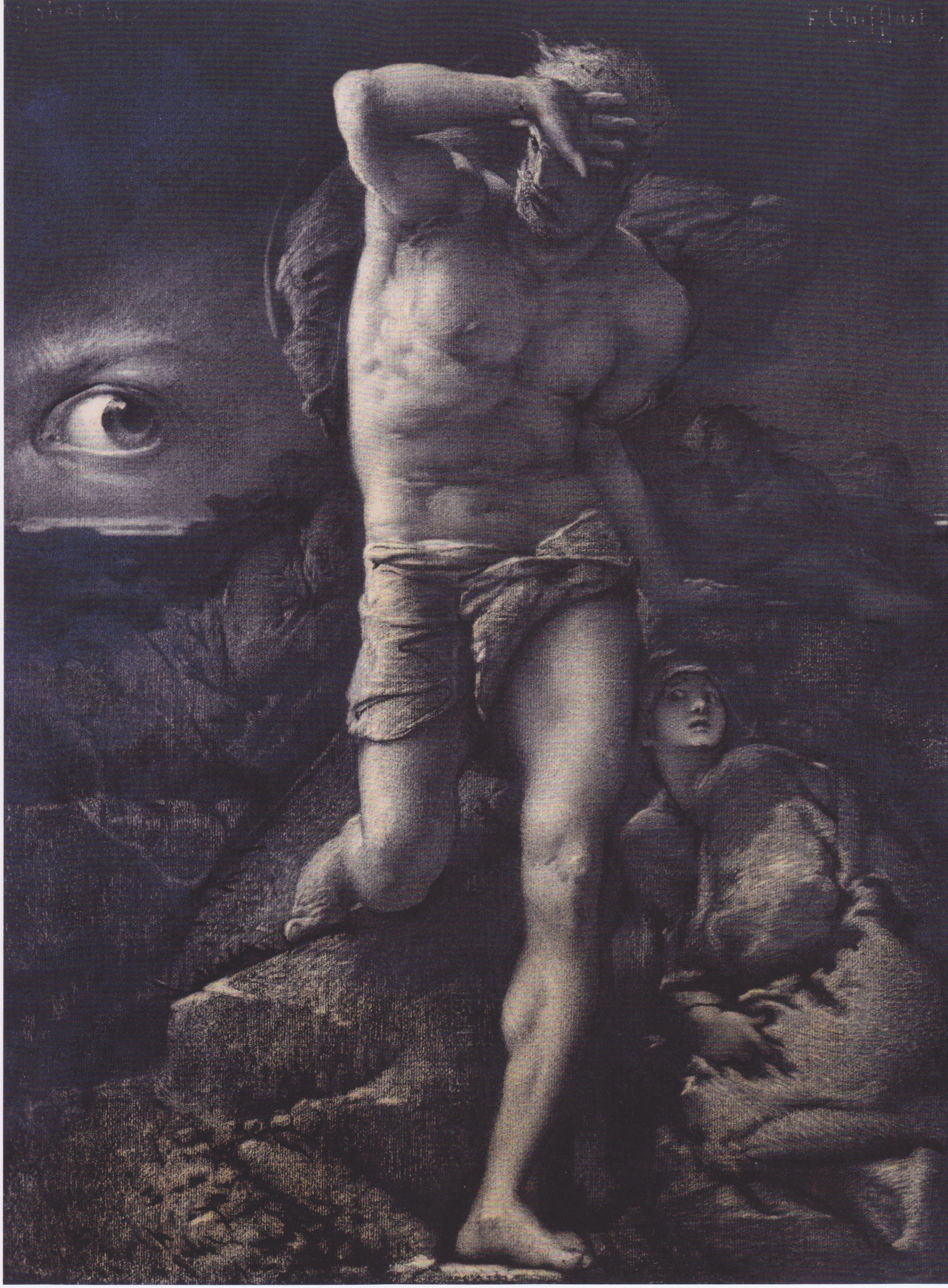
La Conscience (by Victor Hugo), illustration by François Chifflart (1825–1901)

When a defendant acts guilty, some of their actions reveal evidence of deceit, a consciousness of guilt, and their guilty state of mind. This may imply that the defendant committed, or intended to commit, a crime. Typical psychological defenses exhibited by guilty suspects include denial, rationalisation, minimisation, and projection of blame onto the victim.

- Attempts to cover up a crime
- Bribery
- Changing name or personal appearance
- Destruction or concealment of evidence (including a body or weapon)
- Discovery abuse
- Failure to explain possession of the property
- False alibis
- False statements and lies
- Feigned lack of memory or recall
- Hush money payments
- Lying "to protect an accomplice"
- Refusal by a driver who has been [lawfully] arrested to submit to a chemical test (blood alcohol content) at the request of a peace officer who has reasonable cause to believe that the person arrested was driving under the influence
- Shifting blame to an innocent person
- Unexplained flight from the crime scene, jurisdiction, or authorities
- Witness or prosecutor intimidation

== Cautions ==
A defendant may introduce innocent explanations of conduct that counter accusations of consciousness of guilt, and a "jury should be advised of the limited probative value of 'consciousness of guilt' evidence".

The Fifth Amendment to the United States Constitution protects the right against self-incrimination. Under the U.S. Supreme Court decisions in Miranda v. Arizona (1966) and Doyle v. Ohio (1976), a defendant's post-arrest silence may not be introduced by the government as evidence of the defendant's guilt, and the prosecution may not comment ocn the defendant's refusal to testify. The Supreme Court has not explicitly decided whether a defendant's pre-arrest silence may be introduced as substantive evidence of guilt (i.e., may be used in the government's case-in-chief, even if the defendant chooses not to testify). A three-justice plurality of the Court, in Salinas v. Texas (2013), held that such silence was admissible where the defendant did not expressly invoke his or her Fifth Amendment rights.

== International law ==
Some commentators have noted that consciousness-of-guilt evidence may be used in international criminal law.

== Literary examples ==
DOJ attorney Dan E. Stigall uses Raskolnikov, the fictional protagonist of Dostoevsky's Crime and Punishment, to discuss "consciousness of guilt" and how "such evidence can be used to demonstrate an accused's culpability":

In all literature, there is perhaps no better example of a man wrestling with the knowledge of his own guilt than that of Raskolnikov in Dostoyevsky's Crime and Punishment. Within the struggles of the main character, the reader sees numerous examples of behavior that demonstrate a suspect's consciousness of guilt: disposing of the evidence, giving false exculpatory statements, fleeing the scene, and displaying an unusually nervous demeanor. Modern jurisprudence reveals that such behavior is admissible in contemporary criminal trials for the purpose of establishing guilt, highlighting the importance of acute observation of an accused's actions while demonstrating definitively Dostoyevsky's unique insight into the human condition and the criminal mind.

Shakespearean scholar A. C. Bradley describes Macbeth's "consciousness of guilt" as "stronger in him than the consciousness of failure; and it keeps him in a perpetual agony of restlessness, and forbids him simply to droop and pine. His mind is 'full of scorpions.' He cannot sleep."

In Shakespeare's Hamlet, "The lady doth protest too much, methinks" describes overreactions to accusations as an expression of a consciousness of guilt.

== See also ==
- Guilt (emotion)
- Guilt (law)
- Measures of guilt and shame
