= Sarcasm =

Sharp, bitter remark

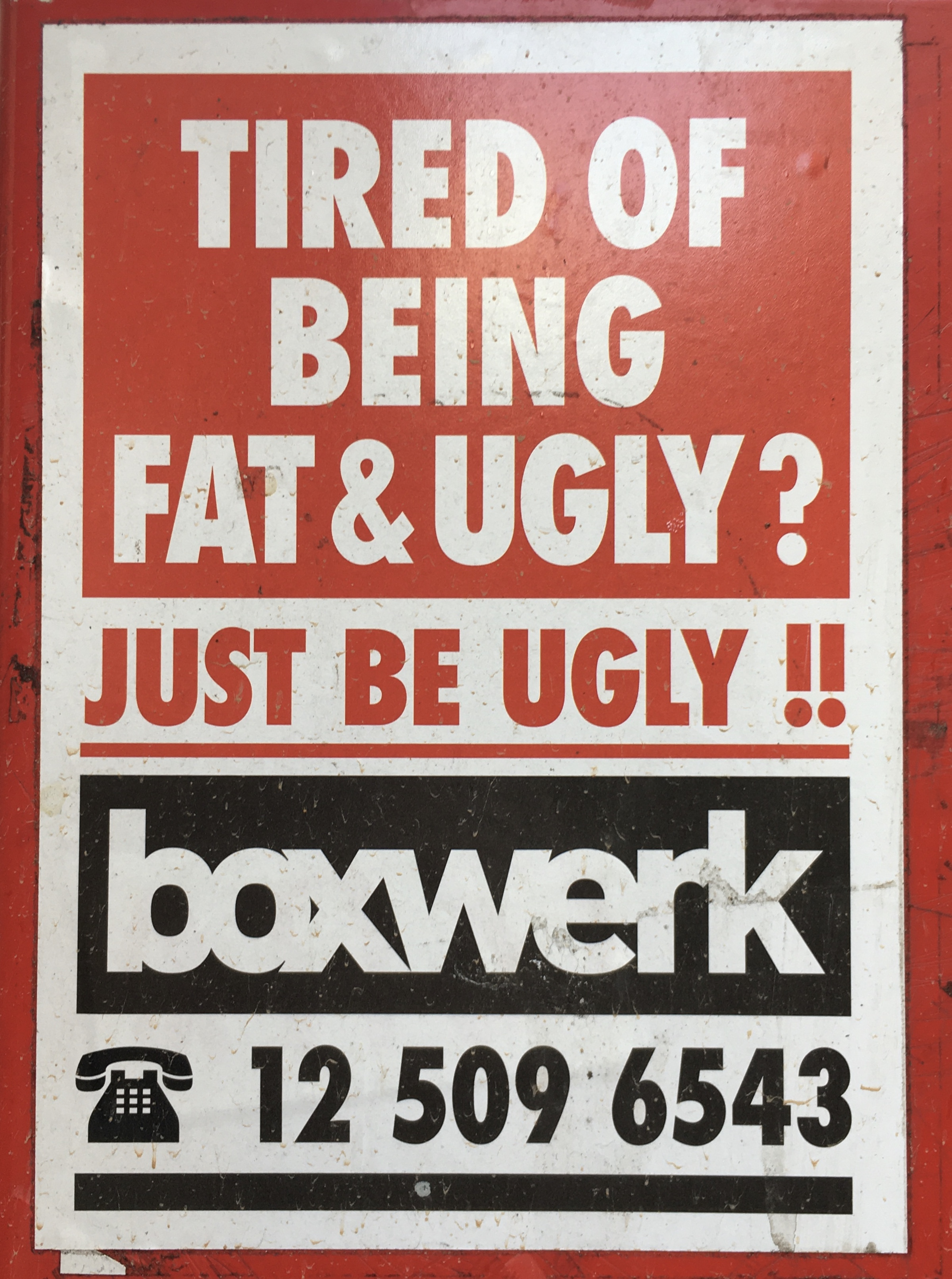
Use of sarcasm in an ad sticker of a boxing studio. The message is negative and directly mocks, or even jokingly insults, the person targeted by the advertisement.

Sarcasm is the caustic use of words, often in a humorous way, to mock someone or something. Sarcasm may employ ambivalence, and is also commonly associated with, though it does not necessarily contain, irony. Most noticeable in speech, sarcasm is mainly distinguished by the inflection with which it is spoken or, with an undercurrent of irony, by the extreme disproportion of the comment to the situation, and is largely context-dependent.

== Etymology ==
The word comes from the Ancient Greek σαρκασμός (sarkasmós) which is taken from σαρκάζειν (sarkázein) meaning "to tear flesh, bite the lip in rage, sneer".

It is first recorded in English in 1579, in an annotation to The Shepheardes Calender by Edmund Spenser:

Tom piper, an ironicall Sarcasmus, spoken in derision of these rude wits, whych ...

However, the word sarcastic, meaning "Characterized by or involving sarcasm; given to the use of sarcasm; bitterly cutting or caustic", does not appear until 1695.

== Usage ==
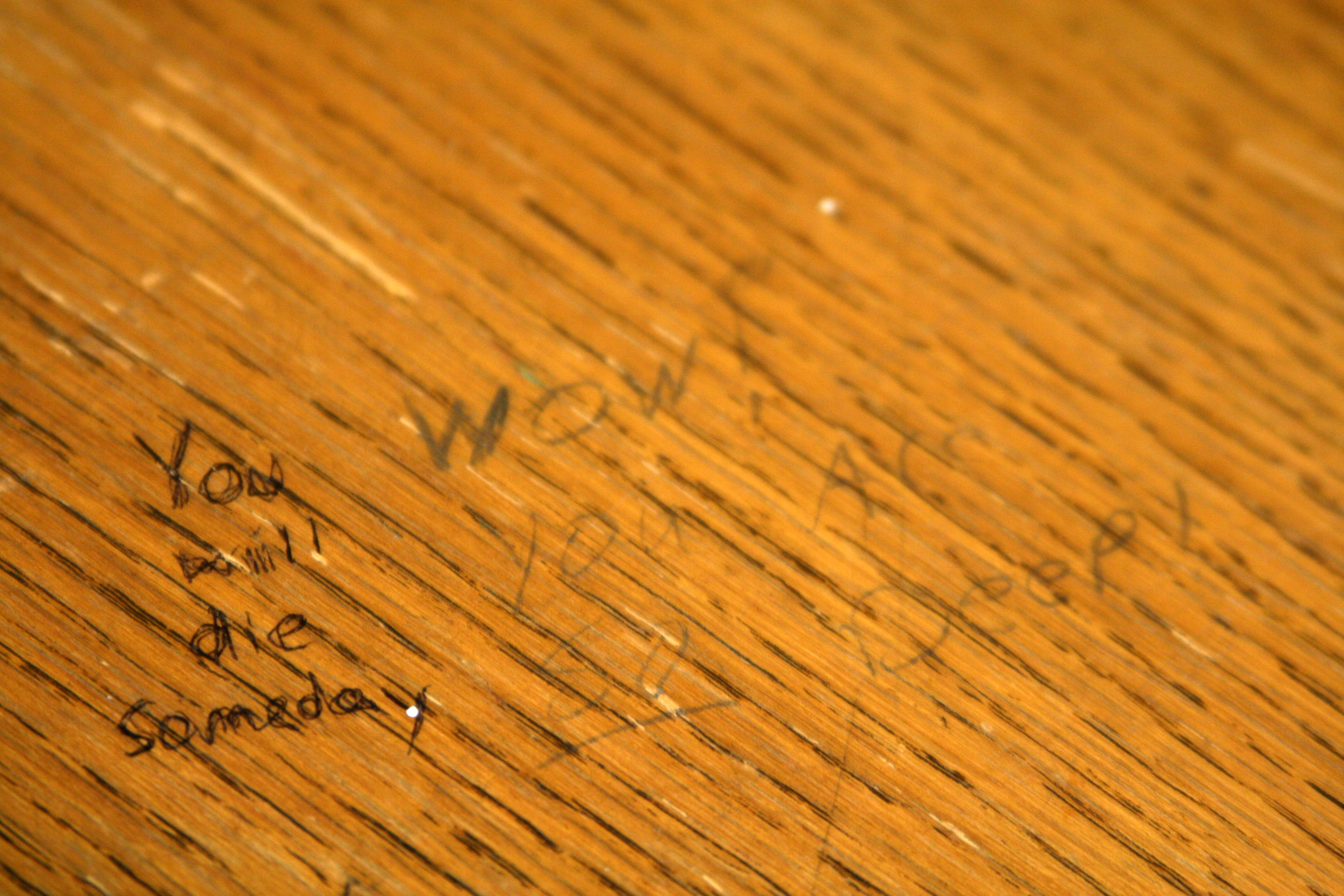
A sarcastic response written on a table that reads "Wow, you are SO deep!

Researchers have expressed that sarcasm can be difficult to define because people use and interpret it in different ways. Studies have identified several strategies for communicating sarcasm including exaggeration, jocularity, and condescension.

Linguist Derek Bousfield describes sarcasm as a form of mock politeness in which a remark may appear appropriate on the surface but is intended to communicate the opposite in its treatment of the receiver.

Sarcasm and Irony are closely related but are not the same. John Haiman explains that irony can happen unintentionally, while sarcasm requires direct intention from the speaker. He describes sarcasm as deliberate use of irony to express verbal aggression.

== In psychology ==
Professionals in psychology and related fields have long looked upon sarcasm negatively, particularly noting that sarcasm tends to be a maladaptive coping mechanism for those with unresolved anger or frustrations. Psychologist Clifford N. Lazarus describes sarcasm as "hostility disguised as humor". While an occasional sarcastic comment may enliven a conversation, Lazarus suggests that too frequent use of sarcasm tends to "overwhelm the emotional flavor of any conversation".

== Understanding ==
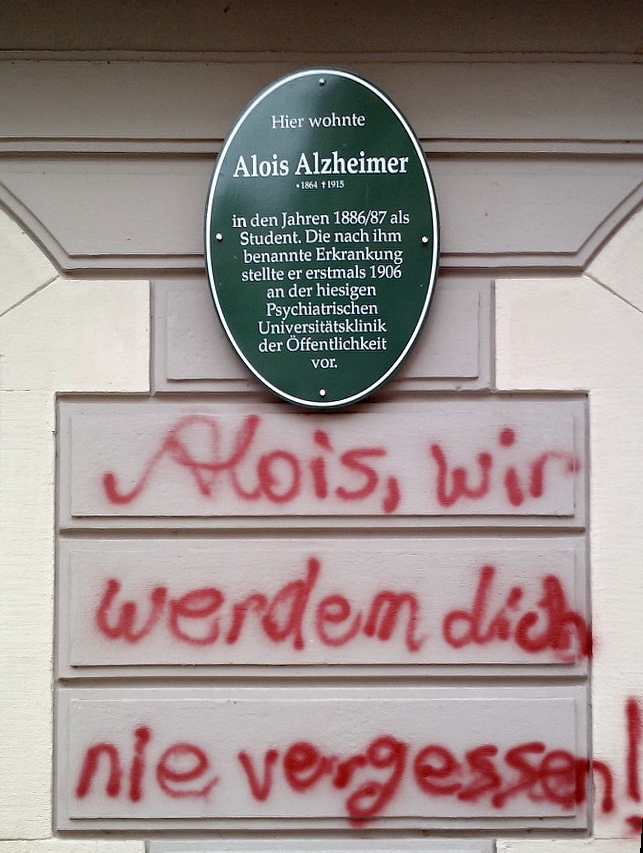
Sarcastic comment below a memorial plaque for Alois Alzheimer who first described Alzheimer's disease. The German text means "Alois, we will never forget you!", subtly playing with the contradiction between a disease deteriorating the human memory, the purpose of the memorial and the added text.

Understanding the subtlety of this usage requires second-order interpretation of the speaker's or writer's intentions; different parts of the brain must work together to understand sarcasm. This sophisticated understanding can be lacking in some people with certain forms of brain damage, dementia and sometimes autism, and this perception has been located by MRI in the right parahippocampal gyrus. Research on the anatomy of sarcasm has shown, according to Richard Delmonico, a neuropsychologist at University of California, Davis, that people with damage in the prefrontal cortex have difficulty understanding non-verbal aspects of language like tone. Neuroscientist David Salmon at the University of California, San Diego, stated that this type of research could help doctors distinguish between different types of neurodegenerative diseases, such as frontotemporal dementia and Alzheimer's disease.

In William Brant's Critique of Sarcastic Reason, sarcasm is hypothesized to develop as a cognitive and emotional tool that adolescents use in order to test the borders of politeness and truth in conversation. Sarcasm recognition and expression both require the development of understanding forms of language, especially if sarcasm occurs without a cue or signal (e.g., a sarcastic tone or rolling the eyes). Sarcasm is argued to be more sophisticated than lying because lying is expressed as early as the age of three, but sarcastic expressions take place much later during development (Brant, 2012). According to Brant (2012, 145–6), sarcasm is

(a) form of expression of language often including the assertion of a statement that is disbelieved by the expresser (e.g., where the sentential meaning is disbelieved by the expresser), although the intended meaning is different from the sentence meaning. The recognition of sarcasm without the accompaniment of a cue develops around the beginning of adolescence or later. Sarcasm involves the expression of an insulting remark that requires the interpreter to understand the negative emotional connotation of the expresser within the context of the situation at hand. Irony, contrarily, does not include derision, unless it is sarcastic irony. The problems with these definitions and the reason why this dissertation does not thoroughly investigate the distinction between irony and sarcasm involves the ideas that: (1) people can pretend to be insulted when they are not or pretend not to be insulted when they are seriously offended; (2) an individual may feel ridiculed directly after the comment and then find it humorous or neutral thereafter; and (3) the individual may not feel insulted until years after the comment was expressed and considered.

Cultural perspectives on sarcasm vary widely with more than a few cultures and linguistic groups finding it offensive to varying degrees. Thomas Carlyle despised it: "Sarcasm I now see to be, in general, the language of the devil; for which reason I have long since as good as renounced it". Fyodor Dostoevsky, on the other hand, recognized in it a cry of pain: Sarcasm, he said, was "usually the last refuge of modest and chaste-souled people when the privacy of their soul is coarsely and intrusively invaded." RFC 1855, a collection of guidelines for Internet communications, includes a warning to be especially careful with it as it "may not travel well." Another study of sarcasm over email verifies these claims. A professional translator has advised that international business executives "should generally avoid sarcasm in intercultural business conversations and written communications" because of the difficulties in translating sarcasm.

A 2015 study by L. Huang, F. Gino and A.D. Galinsky of the Harvard Business School "tests a novel theoretical model in which both the construction and interpretation of sarcasm lead to greater creativity because they activate abstract thinking."

== Vocal indication ==
In English, sarcasm is often telegraphed with kinesic/prosodic cues by speaking more slowly and with a lower pitch. Similarly, Dutch uses a lowered pitch; sometimes to such an extent that the expression is reduced to a mere mumble. But other research shows that there are many ways that real speakers signal sarcastic intentions. One study found that in Cantonese, sarcasm is indicated by raising the fundamental frequency of one's voice. In Amharic, rising intonation is used to show sarcasm.

== Punctuation ==
Though in the English language there is not any standard accepted method to denote irony or sarcasm in written conversation, several forms of punctuation have been proposed. Among them is the irony mark of Alcanter de Brahm in the 19th century, which looked somewhat like a backwards question mark. Each of these punctuation marks are primarily used to indicate that a sentence should be understood as ironic, but not necessarily designate sarcasm that is not ironic. By contrast, more recent proposals, such as the snark mark, or the use of the following tilde are specifically intended to denote sarcasm rather than irony. A bracketed exclamation point or question mark as well as scare quotes are also sometimes used to express irony or ironic sarcasm.

In certain Ethiopic languages, sarcasm and unreal phrases are indicated at the end of a sentence with a sarcasm mark called temherte slaq, a character that looks like an inverted exclamation point ¡. The usage directly parallels John Wilkins' 1668 proposal to use the inverted exclamation point as an irony mark. A proposal by Asteraye Tsigie and Daniel Yacob in 1999 to include the temherte slaq in Unicode was unsuccessful.

== Sarcasm and irony ==
While sarcasm (harsh ridicule or mockery) is often directly associated with verbal irony (meaning the opposite of what is said) and the two are frequently used together; sarcasm is not necessarily ironic by definition, and either element can be used without the other.

Examples of sarcasm and irony used together:

"My you're early!" (After one arrives extremely late).

"What a fine artist you've become!" (When meaning to express displeasure).

Example of sarcasm without irony: (frequently attributed to Winston Churchill)

After an onlooker comments on one being drunk: "My dear, tomorrow I will be sober, and you will still be ugly!"

Example of irony without sarcasm:

After a popular teacher apologizes to the class for answering his phone in the other room: "I don't know if we can forgive you!"

== Identifying ==
A French company has developed an analytics tool that claims to have up to 80% accuracy in identifying sarcastic comments posted online.

In June 2014, the United States Secret Service requested bids for software that would identify sarcasm in tweets.

Researchers have examined how sarcasm can be identified through speech. A study in 2024 by Gina M. Caucci, Roger J. Kreuz, and Eugene H. Buder found that sarcastic statements can be different from literal statements in vocal characteristics such as pitch and volume. The study also found that people use stronger vocal cues with friends rather than strangers.

Research has also explored the use of machine learning to identify sarcasm in writing. A 2020 review by Samer Muthana Sarsam and colleagues examined 31 studies on detecting sarcasm in Twitter(now X) post. The review found that machine learning systems use features like word choice and linguistic context to classify sarcastic messages. However, it became more difficult for the system to detect sarcasm when slang, abbreviations, and ambiguity were involved in the post.

== In religion ==
The Buddhist monk Ṭhānissaro Bhikkhu has identified sarcasm as contrary to right speech, an aspect of the Noble Eightfold Path leading to the end of suffering. He opines that sarcasm is an unskillful and unwholesome method of humor, which he contrasts with an approach based on frankly highlighting the ironies inherent in life.

== See also ==
- Facetiousness
- Guiltive
- Hyperbole
- Irony
- Oxymoron
- Paradox
- Poe's law
- Sardonicism
- Smirk
- Snarl
- Sneer
- Tongue-in-cheek
- Witticism
