= Judith Lewis Herman =

American psychiatrist (born 1942)

- Born: 31 March 1942 (age 84); New York City, New York, United States
- Education: Radcliffe College; Harvard Medical School
- Known for: Research on complex post-traumatic stress disorder and incest
- Scientific career
- Fields: Psychiatry

Judith Lewis Herman (born 31 March 1942) is an American psychiatrist, researcher, teacher, and author who has focused on the understanding and treatment of incest and traumatic stress.

Herman is Professor of Psychiatry at Harvard Medical School, Director of Training at the Victims of Violence Program in the Department of Psychiatry at the Cambridge Health Alliance in Cambridge, Massachusetts, and a founding member of the Women's Mental Health Collective.

She was the recipient of the 1996 Lifetime Achievement Award from the International Society for Traumatic Stress Studies and the 2000 Woman in Science Award from the American Medical Women's Association. In 2003, she was named a Distinguished Fellow of the American Psychiatric Association.

== Early life ==
Herman was born in New York City to Helen Lewis, who was a psychologist and psychoanalyst and taught at Yale University, and Naphtali Lewis, who worked as a professor of classics at City University of New York. She received her education at Radcliffe College and Harvard Medical School.

== Career ==
Herman's work focuses on the understanding of trauma and its victims, as set out in her second book, Trauma and Recovery. There she distinguishes between single-incident traumas – one-off events – which she termed Type I traumas, and complex or repeated traumas (Type II). Type I trauma, according to the United States Department of Veterans Affairs Center for Post Traumatic Stress Disorder, "accurately describes the symptoms that result when a person experiences a short-lived psychological trauma". Type II – the concept of complex post-traumatic stress disorder (CPTSD) – includes "the syndrome that follows upon prolonged, repeated trauma". Although not yet accepted by DSM-IV as a separate diagnostic category, the notion of complex traumas has been found useful in clinical practice, although the 11th revision of ICD (ICD-11), released in 2018, included that diagnosis for the first time.

Herman also set out a three-stage sequence of trauma treatment and recovery. The first and most important involved the establishment of safety, which might be especially difficult for those in abusive relationships. The second phase involved active work upon the trauma, fostered by that secure base, and employing any of a range of psychological techniques. The final stage was represented by an advance to a new post-traumatic life, possibly broadened by the experience of surviving the trauma and all it involved.

Herman is studying the effects of the justice system on victims of sexual violence to discover a better way for victims of crimes to interact with the 'adversarial' system of crime and punishment in the U.S.

== Works ==
=== Books ===
- Herman, Judith Lewis (1997) [1992]. Trauma and Recovery: The Aftermath of Violence - from Domestic Abuse to Political Terror. New York: BasicBooks. ISBN 978-0-465-08730-3.
- Herman, Judith Lewis (2000) [1981]. Father-daughter Incest. Cambridge, Massachusetts: Harvard University Press. ISBN 978-0-674-07651-8.
- Herman, Judith Lewis. (2023) Truth and Repair: How Trauma Survivors Envision Justice. London: Basic Books.ISBN 978-1-5416-0054-6

=== Selected book chapters ===
- Herman, Judith Lewis (2003), "Introduction: Hidden in Plain Sight: Clinical Observations on Prostitution", in Farley, Melissa (ed.), Prostitution, Trafficking and Traumatic Stress, Binghamton, New York: Haworth Maltreatment & Trauma Press, pp. 1–16, ISBN 978-1-136-76490-5. Sample pdf.

=== Selected articles ===
- Harvey, Mary, and Herman, Judith Lewis (September 1994). "Amnesia, Partial Amnesia, and Delayed Recall among Adult Survivors of Childhood Trauma". Consciousness and Cognition 3 (3-4): 295–206.
- Herman, Judith Lewis (April 2003). "The Mental Health of Crime Victims: Impact of Legal Intervention". Journal of Traumatic Stress. 16 (2): 159–166. doi:10.1023/A:1022847223135. PMID 12699203. S2CID 12123376.
- Herman, Judith Lewis (January 2004). "Introduction: Hidden in Plain Sight: Clinical Observations on Prostitution". Journal of Trauma Practice. 2 (3–4): 1–13. doi:10.1300/J189v02n03_01. S2CID 216134309. Sample pdf.
- Herman, Judith Lewis (May 2005). "Justice from the Victim's Perspective". Violence Against Women. 11 (5): 571–602. doi:10.1177/1077801205274450. PMID 16043563. S2CID 42891871.
- Herman, Judith Lewis; Dutra, Lissa; Callahan, Kelley; Forman, Evan; Mendelsohn, Michaela (January 2008). "Core Schemas and Suicidality in a Chronically Traumatized Population". Journal of Nervous and Mental Disease. 196 (1): 71–74. doi:10.1097/NMD.0b013e31815fa4c1. PMID 18195645. S2CID 11900567.
