= Fake moustache =

Fashion item, disguise component, or performing arts tool

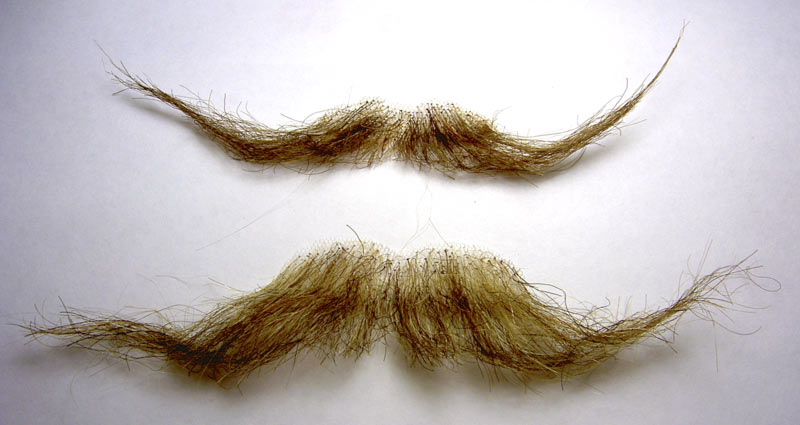
Fake moustaches

A fake moustache or false moustache is an item of prosthetic make-up. Fake moustaches are made in a variety of ways, but usually require a form of adhesive to affix the moustache to the wearer's face.

== History ==
The use of false facial hair dates back to antiquity. In Ancient Egypt, most men were clean-shaven (real facial hair being a signifier of low social status). Pharaohs, however, often wore elaborate false metal beards, linking them with Osiris, the god of the afterlife. In Ancient Greece, Aristophanes referenced false facial hair in his play Assemblywomen, in which the women of Athens disguise themselves as men using false beards.

False facial hair has been used as a disguise for thousands of years. In particular, women throughout history have used false facial hair to disguise themselves as men, often to gain access to freedoms they were denied as women.

False facial hair has also been used for theater and performance since at least the early modern period. Boy players would often wear false facial hair to appear older onstage.

In the 19th century, fake moustaches held associations with deception and criminality. Lewis Powell, one of the conspirators in the Lincoln assassination plot, carried with him a fake moustache during his assassination attempt on William H. Seward. A key witness, Louis J. Weichmann, commented that he "thought no honest person had a reason to wear a false mustache".

Despite these perceptions, false facial hair was worn for aesthetic reasons during the Victorian era, as facial hair was particularly fashionable during this period.

In the mid-20th century, fake mustaches were sold commercially. The New York Herald Tribune reported in 1963 that customers were primarily "young boys for fun or to 'virilize' themselves" as well as "wives who give them to their husbands".

During the 2010s, fake moustaches surged in popularity, as a humorous, ironic, and retro motif.

== Cultural significance ==
In many forms of popular media, the use of a fake moustache as an unconvincing disguise is a commonly used trope. The "disguised face" emoji (🥸) features a fake moustache, as well as a pair of glasses.

Drawn-on fake moustaches are deployed humorously in graffiti and other artistic means. Marcel Duchamp's artwork L.H.O.O.Q. depicts the Mona Lisa with a moustache. In the 1946 cartoon Daffy Doodles, Daffy Duck draws fake moustaches on everyone he sees.

Many iconic moustaches in popular media have been prosthetic: Charlie Chaplin, Groucho Marx, and David Suchet (as Hercule Poirot) all wore fake moustaches. Marx's moustache, in particular, has gained prominence as the namesake of groucho glasses, novelty glasses with a fake moustache attached.

== See also ==
- Groucho glasses
