= Groucho glasses =

Novelty glasses with a nose, moustache, and eyebrows

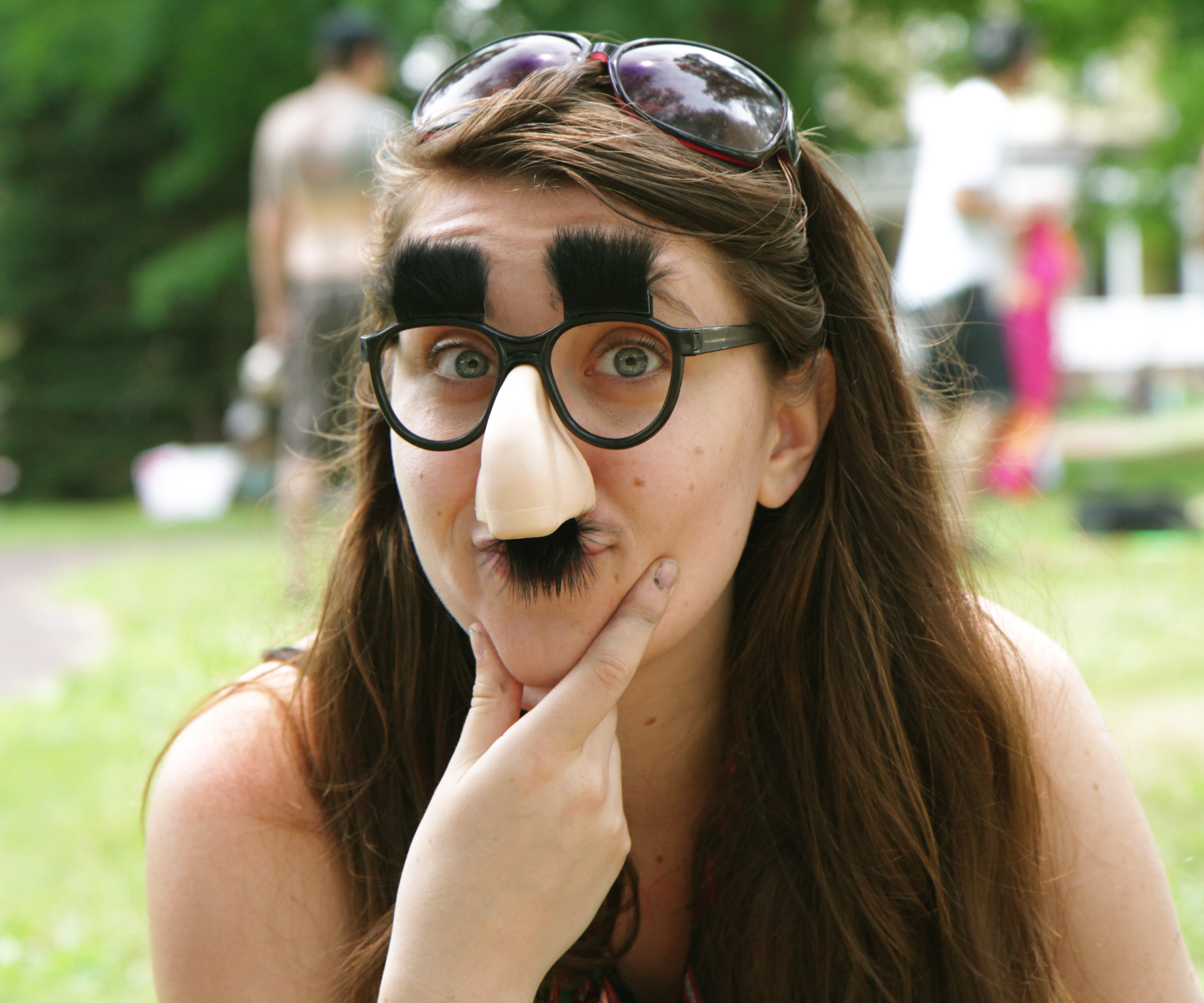
Woman wearing a pair of Groucho glasses

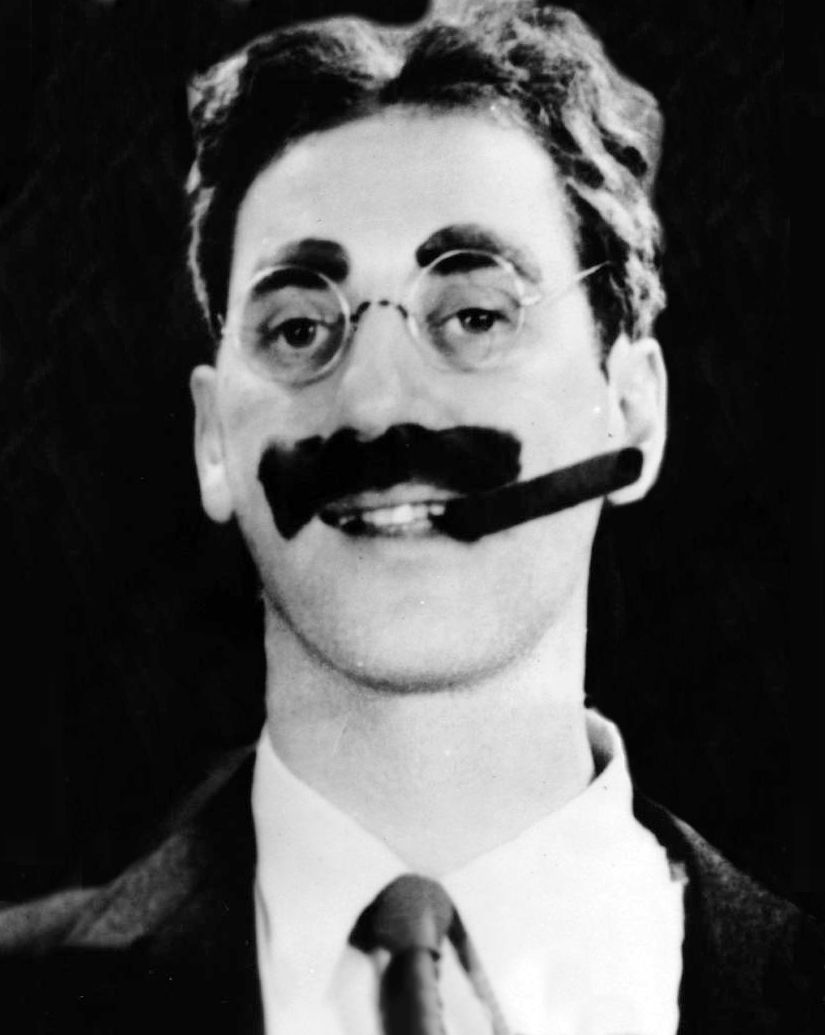
Groucho Marx

Groucho glasses (also known as the beaglepuss) are a humorous novelty disguise which function as a caricature of the stage makeup used by the comedian Groucho Marx in his movies and vaudeville performances. They typically consist of black frames without lenses with attached features including bushy eyebrows, a large plastic nose, bushy moustache, and sometimes a plastic cigar.

Considered one of the most iconic and widely used of all novelty items in the world, Groucho glasses were marketed as early as the 1940s and are instantly recognizable to people throughout the world. The glasses are often used as a shorthand for slapstick and are depicted in the Disguised Face (🥸) emoji.

== Guinness Record Attempts ==
=== Durango’s Snowdown Festival (1988) ===
In 1988, the Snowdown Festival in Durango, Colorado, attempted to set a Guinness World Record for the largest number of people wearing Groucho glasses. The event originated when, in previous Snowdown performances, the host had dressed as Groucho, and the idea grew into a record attempt. Locals were enticed through advertising campaigns, buses, and social excitement, and it is estimated that 500–800 people participated, wearing fake mustaches, enlarged noses, and glasses. The results were possibly not submitted to Guinness, and no official record was registered, but the event marked the beginning of the tradition of Groucho glasses gatherings.

=== Gorham Record (2006) ===
In 2006, the town of Gorham held an event where 1,463 residents gathered to attempt a Guinness World Record by wearing Groucho Marx-style masks, consisting of fake mustaches, enlarged noses, dark eyebrows, and glasses. The event required careful planning, including the correct date, official witnesses, countless glasses, and an area where participants remained for at least ten minutes. Attendees were enticed with music, a DJ, door-to-door and yard campaigns, and prizes such as kayaks and shovels. The event was well-organized, participants were counted and photographed, and Gorham received Guinness recognition for the record titled “The Most People Wearing Groucho Marx Glasses at the Same Time,” which was commemorated in the town’s youth center with a two-page full-color display.
