= Disguise =

Accessories to conceals one's identity

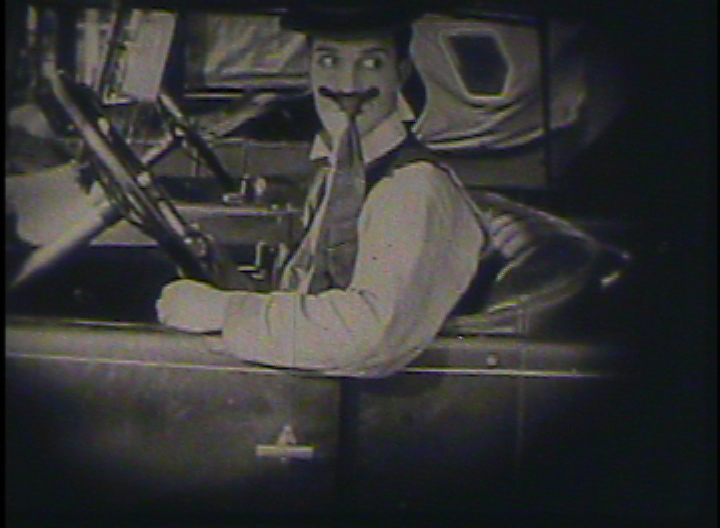
Buster Keaton using his tie as a quick disguise

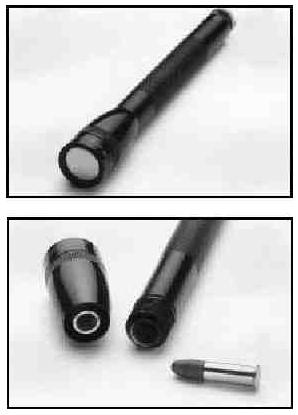
A gun disguised as a maglite

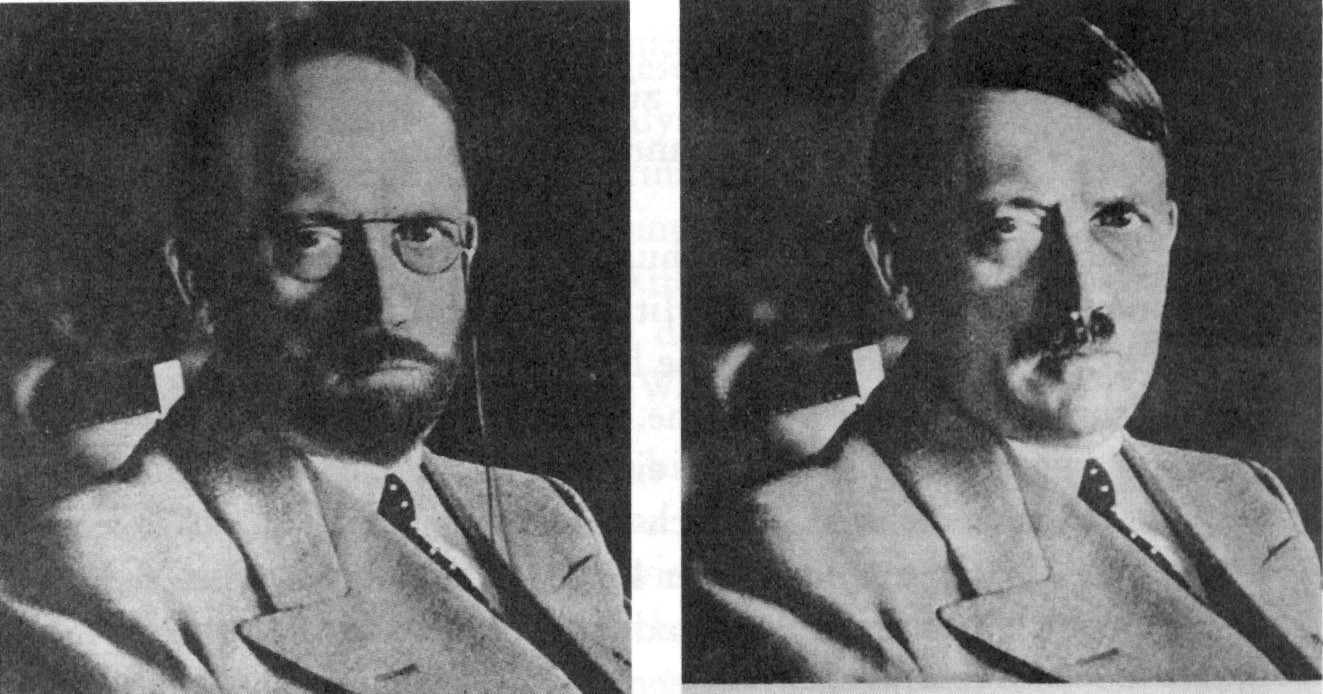
Adolf Hitler depicted in possible disguises by the United States Secret Service in 1944

A disguise can be anything incognito which conceals one's identity or changes a person's physical appearance, including a wig, glasses, makeup, fake moustache, costume or other items. Camouflage is a type of disguise for people, animals and objects. Hats, glasses, changes in hair style or wigs, plastic surgery, and make-up are also used.

Disguises can be used by criminals, terrorists, secret agents and special forces operators seeking to avoid identification. A person working for an agency trying to get information might go "undercover" to get information without being recognised by the public; a celebrity may go "incognito" in order to avoid unwelcome press attention. Protests often feature people dressed in humorous costumes while political publicity stunts and pranks sometimes employ disguises and imposture. In comic books and films, disguises are often used by superheroes, and in science fiction they may be used by aliens. Dressing up in costumes is a Halloween tradition.

== Types of disguise ==
=== Clothing ===
The most basic type of disguise is to use clothing to conceal one's identity. Such a method is commonly used by undercover police investigators, government agents and special forces operators, who go "plainclothes" during a clandestine operation to disguise themselves as an ordinary citizen rather than wearing their typical uniform. Most investigators and agents have a diverse disguise kit that includes makeup and different forms of clothing. Face-obscuring accoutrements can thwart facial recognition systems, making them often used by protesters.

=== Costume ===
Costumes are usually intended to change one's identity so that they appear to be a certain fictional character and can assume the role of that character. They are an essential tool of actors in entertainment, such as in film and on stage. Costumes can range from simple clothing changes to more elaborate full-body outfits such as mascots.

=== Realistic ===
A realistic disguise can totally change the identity of a person down to their basic appearance, making it impossible to tell who they really are. While realistic latex masks are more commonly seen as a plot device in fiction, they have also been used in real life as well. Creature suits that disguise a person as an animal or monster are used in entertainment, cosplay, as well as hoaxes.

== In fiction ==
=== Myths and legends ===
The concept of the human guise is often used by various shapeshifting mythical beings, such as supernatural creatures and deities, to test or fool humans, or allow themselves to pass amongst them without suspicion.

In epic poetry, Odysseus uses the disguise of a beggar to test his family's and servants' loyalty upon his return from a 10-year voyage.

=== Superhero fiction ===
In comic books and superhero fiction, disguises are used to hide secret identities and keep special powers secret from ordinary people. For example, Superman passes himself off as Clark Kent, and Spider-Man disguises himself in a costume so that he cannot be recognized as Peter Parker.

The Clay Camel, one of Mandrake the Magician's foes, is considered the Master of the Disguise, because he is able to mimic anyone and can change his appearance in seconds.

In Marvel Comics, a common enemy of Spider-Man is The Chameleon, whose main tactic is his ability to easily blend into crowds, change his voice, and make masks that look identical to other people.

=== Detective and spy fiction ===
Disguise is sometimes used in criminal activity and in spying, and is a common trend in detective and spy fiction. Arsene Lupin is feared in Maurice Leblanc's stories because of his extreme ability to disguise himself; this is a trademark of Lupin.

Sherlock Holmes often disguised himself as someone else to avoid being recognized. Examples include dressing as a peddler in order to avoid being spotted on the moor so that he could get his investigative work done in The Hound of the Baskervilles, or as an Indian sailor so that he could speak with Professor Moriarty about his evil plan in Sherlock Holmes and the Secret Weapon.

=== Science fiction ===
In science fiction, aliens often take on a human appearance wearing "human suits" as a disguise. An example is the franchise V, in which the alien Visitors are actually lizard-like in appearance beneath their realistic latex (or in the reboot, biological) disguises.

Robots can also commonly pass themselves off as human using a realistic outer skin, sometimes leading to a plot twist if a character is revealed as an android. Robotic characters may be used as spies or moles within otherwise human groups. An example of such a plot device is the disguise of the Terminator.

== See also ==
- Animegao kigurumi
- Alter ego
- Carnival in the Netherlands
- Consciousness of guilt
- Impersonator
- Mask
- VTuber
