= Helen Block Lewis =

American psychiatrist (1913–1987)

Helen Lewis
- Born: August 22, 1913; New York City, New York, United States
- Died: January 18, 1987 (aged 73); Cambridge, Massachusetts, United States
- Education: Columbia University (PhD)
- Occupations: Psychologist, psychoanalyst, educator, and author
- Known for: studies on the differences between guilt and shame
- Spouse: Naphtali Lewis
- Children: Judith and John

Helen Block Lewis (August 22, 1913 – January 18, 1987) was an American psychologist and psychoanalyst. Her work pioneered the study of the differences between guilt and shame. She founded the journal Psychoanalytic Psychology, taught at universities, was the psychoanalysis division president of the American Psychological Association, and wrote several books. Her books include Shame and Guilt in Neurosis, Psychic War in Men and Women, Freud and Modern Psychology volume 1 and 2, Sex and the Superego, and The Role of Shame in Symptom Formation.

== Personal life and death ==
Helen Block Lewis was born on Henry Street in Manhattan, New York City, in 1913. She was a first-generation American and her parents were Eastern European Jews. While attending Barnard College at age 16, Lewis was in charge of the student newspaper and became a communist. Lewis graduated from Columbia University with a doctorate degree. She married classicist Naphtali Lewis. Her daughter is psychiatrist Judith Herman and Lewis encouraged her in academia while suggesting that she attend medical school to have "more power". Lewis also had a son John B. and two grandchildren. Lewis died at age 73 due to cancer at her Cambridge, Massachusetts, home on January 18, 1987.

== Career ==
Lewis was an experimental psychologist and an instructor at Brooklyn College until the late 1940s, upon realizing that she could not receive academic tenure due to her having once been a part of the Communist Party. In the mid-1940s, she taught psychology at the Communist-affiliated Jefferson School of Social Science. Unable to be hired elsewhere so she used her father's inheritance to train as a psychoanalyst. Lewis founded the journal Psychoanalytic Psychology along with being a practitioner, a supervisor, and a researcher. She also taught at The New School for Social Research and Swarthmore College. She was an educator at the National Psychological Association for Psychoanalysis, the Institute for Psychoanalytic Training and Research, and the Postgraduate Center for Mental Health. After lecturing for the Graduate Training Program at Yale University and about psychiatry at the Yale University School of Medicine, Lewis started her own practice in 1945. Lewis analyzed the emotions of shame and guilt in relation to transference and countertransference. She was the psychoanalysis division president of the American Psychological Association from 1984 to 1985. Her books include Shame and Guilt in Neurosis, Psychic War in Men and Women, Freud and Modern Psychology volume 1 and 2, Sex and the Superego, and The Role of Shame in Symptom Formation.

Lewis' work pioneered the study on the differences between shame and guilt. Discoveries that Lewis made as a clinical psychologist at Yale University have influenced further studies of guilt, shame, and unacknowledged shame. Researcher June Price Tangney and her colleagues were able to confirm many of Lewis' findings. They learned that "the experience of guilt leads to a focus on specific behaviors" and is "less painful than shame" while being "remorse, regret, and tension without disrupting the unity of the self or impairing the self through global devaluation". On the other side, "shame is not about one's deed", but rather the "self". The "internal command of guilt" is to stop doing something for violating "a rule or standard" and to change the behavior. Shame's "internal command" is "Stop. You are no good".
