= Cognitive styles analysis =

Cognitive styles analysis (CSA) was developed by Richard J. Riding and is the most frequently used computerized measure of cognitive styles. Although CSA is not well known in North American institutions, it is quite popular among European universities and organizations.

Rezaei & Katz (2004, p. 1318) state:

"A number of different labels have been given to cognitive styles and, according to Riding, many of these are but different conceptions of the same dimensions (Riding & Sadler-Smith 1992). Riding and Cheema (Riding & Cheema 1991) surveyed the various (about 30) labels and, after reviewing the descriptions, correlations, methods of assessment, and effect on behavior, concluded that the styles may be grouped into two principal groups: the Wholist-Analytic and the Verbal-Imagery dimensions. It is argued that these dimensions of cognitive style are very fundamental because they develop early in life and are pervasive given their effect on social behavior, decision making, and learning."

Unlike many other cognitive style measures, CSA has been the subject of much empirical investigation. Three experiments reported by Rezaei & Katz (2004) showed the reliability of CSA to be low. Considering the theoretical strength of CSA, and unsuccessful earlier attempts to create a more reliable parallel form of it (Peterson, Deary & Austin 2003), a revised version was made to improve its validity and reliability.

== Notes ==
- Peterson, Elizabeth; Deary, Ian J.; Austin, Elizabeth J. (2003), "The reliability of Riding's cognitive style analysis test", Personality and Individual Differences, 34 (5): 881–891, doi:10.1016/s0191-8869(02)00116-2.
- Rezaei, A.; Katz, L. (2004), "Evaluation of the reliability and validity of the cognitive styles analysis", Personality and Individual Differences, 36 (6): 1317–1327, doi:10.1016/s0191-8869(03)00219-8.
- Riding, Richard J.; Cheema, Indra (1991), "Cognitive styles—an overview and integration", Educational Psychology, 11.3-4 (3–4): 193–215, doi:10.1080/0144341910110301.
- Riding, Richard J.; Sadler-Smith, Euguene (1992), "Type of instructional material, cognitive style and learning performance", Educational Studies, 18 (3): 323–340, doi:10.1080/0305569920180306.
