= Guilt (emotion) =

Cognitive or an emotional experience

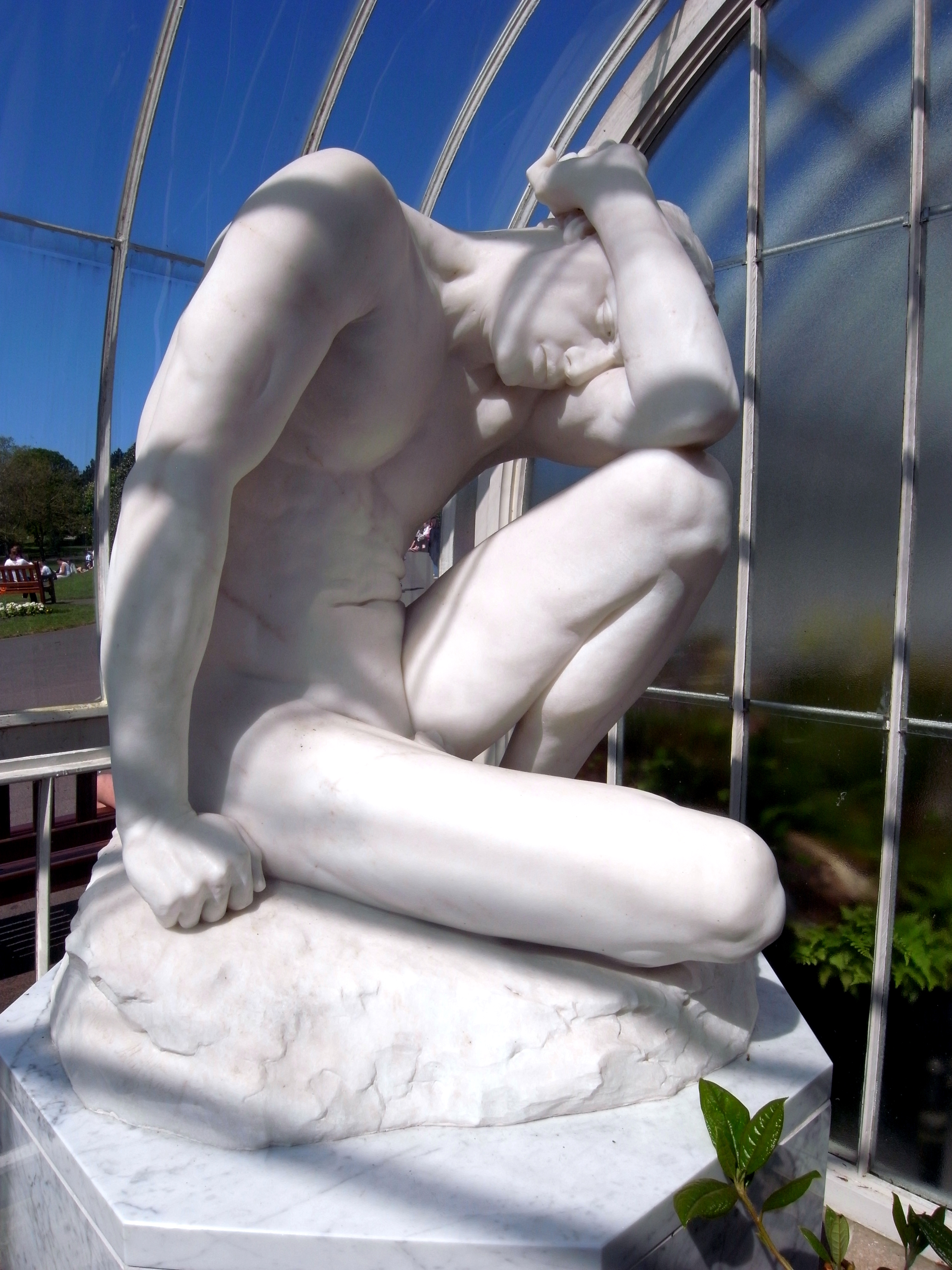
Glasgow Botanic Gardens. Kibble Palace. Edwin Roscoe Mullins – Cain or My Punishment is Greater than I can Bear (Genesis 4:13), about 1899.

Guilt is a moral emotion that occurs when a person believes or realizes—accurately or not—that they have compromised their own standards of conduct or have violated universal moral standards and bear significant responsibility for that violation. Feeling guilty is unpleasant for people while they experience it, but it can prompt positive, pro-social efforts to restore relationships and make amends.

When understood as a collection of basic emotions, guilt is composed of self-directed anger, sadness for the victim, anxiety, and fear (e.g., of damaging or losing relationships with individuals and society). Guilt is closely related to the concepts of remorse, regret, and shame.

Guilt is an important factor in perpetuating obsessive–compulsive disorder symptoms.

== Psychology ==
Guilt and its associated causes, advantages, and disadvantages are common themes in psychology and psychiatry. Both in specialized and in ordinary language, guilt is an affective state in which one experiences conflict at having done something that one believes one should not have done (or conversely, having not done something one believes one should have done). It gives rise to a feeling which does not go away easily, driven by the conscience, or what Sigmund Freud called the superego. Freud rejected the role of God and blamed the existence of guilt instead on the individual's own "fear of loss of love" and relationships, beginning in childhood, with a fear that parents could reject the child. The child turns this fear inward, to create self-directed anger. For Freud's later explicator, Jacques Lacan, guilt was the inevitable companion of the signifying subject who acknowledged normality in the form of the Symbolic order.

Alice Miller claims that "many people suffer all their lives from this oppressive feeling of guilt, the sense of not having lived up to their parents' expectations....no argument can overcome these guilt feelings, for they have their beginnings in life's earliest period, and from that they derive their intensity." This may be linked to what Les Parrott has called "the disease of false guilt....At the root of false guilt is the idea that what you feel must be true."

Therapists recognized similar feelings of guilt in individuals that survived traumatic events that involved a loved one perishing, called survivor's guilt.

The philosopher Martin Buber underlined the difference between the Freudian notion of guilt, based on internal conflicts, and existential guilt, based on actual harm done to others.

Guilt is often associated with anxiety. In mania, according to Otto Fenichel, the patient succeeds in applying to guilt "the defense mechanism of denial by overcompensation...re-enacts being a person without guilt feelings."

In psychological research, guilt can be measured by using questionnaires, such as the Differential Emotions Scale (Izard's DES), or the Dutch Guilt Measurement Instrument.

=== Defenses ===
According to psychoanalytic theory, defenses against feeling guilt can become an overriding aspect of one's personality. The methods that can be used to avoid guilt are multiple. They include:

1. Repression, usually used by the superego and ego against instinctive impulses, but on occasion employed against the superego/conscience itself. If the defence fails, then (in a return of the repressed) one may begin to feel guilty years later for actions lightly committed at the time.
2. Projection is another defensive tool with wide applications. It may take the form of blaming the victim: The victim of someone else's accident or bad luck may be offered criticism, the theory being that the victim may be at fault for having attracted the other person's hostility. Alternatively, not the guilt, but the condemning agency itself, may be projected onto other people, in the hope that they will look upon one's deeds more favorably than one's own conscience (a process that verges on ideas of reference).
3. Sharing a feeling of guilt, and thereby being less alone with it, is a motive force in both art and joke-telling; while it is also possible to "borrow" a sense of guilt from someone who is seen as in the wrong, and thereby assuage one's own.
4. Self-harm may be used as an alternative to compensating the object of one's transgression – perhaps in the form of not allowing oneself to enjoy opportunities open to one, or benefits due, as a result of uncompensated guilt feelings.

=== Behavioral responses ===
Guilt proneness is a personality trait that reflects a tendency to feel negative emotions about one's own misdeeds, even when they are not known by others. Guilt proneness is also an important predictor of trustworthiness. The sense of responsibility of guilt-prone people is strong and this makes them trustworthy. Guilt proneness is reliably associated with moral character.

Similarly, feelings of guilt can prompt subsequent virtuous behavior. People who feel guilty may be more likely to exercise restraint, avoid self-indulgence, and exhibit less prejudice.

Guilt prompts reparatory behaviors to alleviate the unpleasant negative emotions that it engenders. People appear to engage in targeted and specific reparatory behaviors toward the persons they wronged or offended. This can restore the relationships that were damaged by the actions that produced the guilty feelings.

=== Lack of guilt in psychopaths ===
Individuals high in psychopathy lack any true sense of guilt or remorse for harm they may have caused others. Instead, they rationalize their behavior, blame someone else, or deny it outright. People with psychopathy have a tendency to be harmful to themselves and to others. They have little ability to plan ahead for the future. An individual with psychopathy will never find themselves at fault because they will do whatever it takes to benefit themselves without reservation. A person that does not feel guilt or remorse would have no reason to find themselves at fault for something that they did with the intention of hurting another person. To a person high in psychopathy, their actions can always be rationalized to be the fault of another person. This is seen by psychologists as part of a lack of moral reasoning (in comparison with the majority of humans), an inability to evaluate situations in a moral framework, and an inability to develop emotional bonds with other people due to a lack of empathy.

One study on psychopaths found that, under certain circumstances, they could willfully empathize with others, and that their empathic reaction initiated the same way it does for controls. Psychopathic criminals were brain-scanned while watching videos of a person harming another individual. The psychopaths' empathic reaction initiated the same way it did for controls when they were instructed to empathize with the harmed individual, and the area of the brain relating to pain was activated when the psychopaths were asked to imagine how the harmed individual felt. The research suggests psychopaths can switch empathy on at will, which would enable them to be both callous and charming. The team who conducted the study say they do not know how to transform this willful empathy into the spontaneous empathy most people have, though they propose it might be possible to rehabilitate psychopaths by helping them to activate their "empathy switch". Others suggested that it remains unclear whether psychopaths' experience of empathy was the same as that of controls, and also questioned the possibility of devising therapeutic interventions that would make the empathic reactions more automatic.

Neuroscientist Antonio R. Damasio and his colleagues showed that subjects with damage to the ventromedial prefrontal cortex lack the ability to empathically feel their way to moral answers, and that when confronted with moral dilemmas, these brain-damaged patients coldly came up with "end-justifies-the-means" answers, leading Damasio to conclude that the point was not that they reached immoral conclusions, but that when they were confronted by a difficult issue – in this case as whether to shoot down a passenger plane hijacked by terrorists before it hits a major city – these patients appear to reach decisions without the anguish that afflicts those with normally functioning brains. According to Adrian Raine, a clinical neuroscientist also at the University of Southern California, one of this study's implications is that society may have to rethink how it judges immoral people: "Psychopaths often feel no empathy or remorse. Without that awareness, people relying exclusively on reasoning seem to find it harder to sort their way through moral thickets. Does that mean they should be held to different standards of accountability?"

=== Causes ===
==== Evolutionary theories ====
Some evolutionary psychologists theorize that guilt and shame helped maintain beneficial relationships, such as reciprocal altruism. If a person feels guilty when he harms another or fails to reciprocate kindness, he is more likely not to harm others or become too selfish. In this way, he reduces the chances of retaliation by members of his tribe, and thereby increases his survival prospects, and those of the tribe or group. As with any other emotion, guilt can be manipulated to control or influence others. As highly social animals living in large, relatively stable groups, humans need ways to deal with conflicts and events in which they inadvertently or purposefully harm others. If someone causes harm to another, and then feels guilt and demonstrates regret and sorrow, the person harmed is likely to forgive. Thus, guilt makes it possible to forgive, and helps hold the social group together.

== Collective guilt ==
Collective guilt (or group guilt) is the unpleasant and often emotional reaction that results among a group of individuals when it is perceived that the group illegitimately harmed members of another group. It is often the result of "sharing a social identity with others whose actions represent a threat to the positivity of that identity". For an individual to experience collective guilt, he must identify himself as a part of the in-group. "This produces a perceptual shift from thinking of oneself in terms of 'I' and 'me' to 'us' or 'we'.”

== Comparison with shame ==
Guilt and shame are two closely related concepts, but they have key differences that should not be overlooked. Cultural Anthropologist Ruth Benedict describes shame as the result of a violation of cultural or social values, while guilt is conjured up internally when one's personal morals are violated. In other words, shame arises from a real or imagined negative perception coming from others, and guilt arises from a negative perception of one's own thoughts or actions.

Psychoanalyst Helen Block Lewis stated that, "The experience of shame is directly about the self, which is the focus of evaluation. In guilt, the self is not the central object of negative evaluation, but rather the thing done is the focus." An individual can still possess a positive perception of themselves while also feeling guilt for certain actions or thoughts they took part in. Contrary to guilt, Shame has a more inclusive focus on the individual as a whole. Fossum and Mason's ideas clearly outline this idea in their book Facing Shame. They state that "While guilt is a painful feeling of regret and responsibility for one's actions, shame is a painful feeling about oneself as a person".

Shame can almost be described as looking at yourself unfavorably through the eyes of others. Psychiatrist Judith Lewis Herman portrays this idea by stating that "Shame is an acutely self-conscious state in which the self is 'split,' imagining the self in the eyes of the other; by contrast, in guilt the self is unified". Both shame and guilt are directly related to self-perception, only shame causes the individual to account for the cultural and social beliefs of others.

Paul Gilbert talks about the powerful hold that shame can take over someone in his article Evolution, Social Roles, and the Differences in Shame and Guilt. He says that "The fear of shame and ridicule can be so strong that people will risk serious physical injury or even death to avoid it. One of the reasons for this is because shame can indicate serious damage to social acceptance and a breakdown in a variety of social relationships. The evolutionary root of shame is in a self-focused, social threat system related to competitive behavior and the need to prove oneself acceptable/desirable to others" Guilt on the other hand evolved from a place of Care-Giving and avoidance of any act that harms others.

== Cultural views ==
Traditional Japanese society, Korean society and Chinese culture are sometimes said to be "shame-based" rather than "guilt-based", in that the social consequences of "getting caught" are seen as more important than the individual feelings or experiences of the agent (see the work of Ruth Benedict). The same has been said of Ancient Greek society, a culture where, in Bruno Snell's words, if "honour is destroyed the moral existence of the loser collapses."

This may lead to more of a focus on etiquette than on ethics as understood in Western civilization, leading some in Western civilizations to question why the word ethos was adapted from Ancient Greek with such vast differences in cultural norms. Christianity and Islam inherit most notions of guilt from Judaism, Persian, and Roman ideas, mostly as interpreted through Augustine, who adapted Plato's ideas to Christianity. The Latin word for guilt is culpa, a word sometimes seen in law literature, for instance in mea culpa meaning "my fault (guilt)".

=== In literature ===
Guilt is a main theme in John Steinbeck's East of Eden, Fyodor Dostoyevsky's Crime and Punishment, Tennessee Williams' A Streetcar Named Desire, William Shakespeare's play Macbeth, Edgar Allan Poe's "The Tell-Tale Heart" and "The Black Cat", and many other works of literature. In Sartre's The Flies, the Furies (in the form of flies) represent the morbid, strangling forces of neurotic guilt which bind us to authoritarian and totalitarian power.

Guilt is a major theme in many works by Nathaniel Hawthorne, and is an almost universal concern of novelists who explore inner life and secrets.

=== In Epicurean Philosophy ===
In his Kyriai Doxai (Principal Doctrines) 17 and 35, Epicurus teaches that we may identify and diagnose guilt by its signs and perturbations. Within his ethical system based on pleasure and pain, guilt manifests as constant fear of detection that emerges from "secretly doing something contrary to an agreement to not harm one another or be harmed".

Since Epicurus rejects supernatural claims, the easiest way to avoid this perturbation is to avoid the antisocial behavior in order to continue enjoying ataraxia (the state of no-perturbation). However, once guilt is unavoidable, Epicurean Guides recommended confession of one's offenses as a practice that helps to purge the character from its evil tendencies and reform the character. According to Norman DeWitt, author of "St Paul and Epicurus", confession was one of the Epicurean practices that was later appropriated by the early Christian communities.

=== In the Christian Bible ===
Guilt in the Christian Bible is not merely an emotional state; it is also a legal state of deserving punishment. The Hebrew Bible does not have a unique word for guilt, but uses a single word to signify: "sin, the guilt of it, the punishment due unto it, and a sacrifice for it." The Greek New Testament uses a word for guilt that means "standing exposed to judgment for sin" (e. g., Romans 3:19). In what Christians call the "Old Testament", Christians believe the Bible teaches that, through sacrifice, one's sins can be forgiven (Judaism categorically rejects this idea, holding that forgiveness of sin is exclusively through repentance, and the role of sacrifices was for atonement of sins committed by accident or ignorance).

The New Testament says that forgiveness is given as written in 1 Corinthians 15:3–4: "3 For what I received I passed on to you as of first importance: that Christ died for our sins according to the Scriptures, for that he was buried, that he was raised on the third day according to the Scriptures." In both the Old Testament and the New Testament, salvation is granted based on God's grace and forgiveness (Gen 6:8; 19:19; Exo 33:12–17; 34:6–7).

The New Testament says that, in Jesus Christ, God took upon Himself the sins of the world and died on the cross to pay mankind's debt (Rom 6:23). Those who repent and accept Christ's sacrifice for their sins, will be redeemed by God and thus not guilty before Him. They will be granted eternal life which will take effect after the Second Coming of Christ (1 Thess 4:13–18).

The Bible agrees with pagan cultures that guilt creates a cost that someone must pay (Heb 9:22). (This assumption was expressed in the previous section, "Defences": "Guilty people punish themselves if they have no opportunity to compensate the transgression that caused them to feel guilty. It was found that self-punishment did not occur if people had an opportunity to compensate the victim of their transgression.") Unlike pagan deities who demanded that debts for sin be paid by humans, God, according to the Bible, loved humanity enough to pay it Himself (Mat 5:45).

== Etymology ==
The word developed its modern spelling from the Old English form gylt ("crime, sin, fault, fine, debt"), which is possibly derived from Old English gieldan ("to pay for, debt"). "Guilty" is similarly from Old English gyltig, itself from gylt.

Its development into a "sense of guilt" is in 1690 as a variation of its original meaning. "Guilt by association" is first recorded in 1941.

== See also ==
- Emotional blackmail
- Consciousness of guilt
- Criminals from a sense of guilt
- Embarrassment
- Georges Bataille
- Guilt by association
  - Collective guilt
    - German collective guilt
  - Survivor guilt
  - White guilt
- Guilt culture
  - Catholic guilt
    - Mea culpa
- Guilt trip
- Guiltive
- Guilty pleasure
- Measures of guilt and shame
- Mens rea
- Nietzsche
- Postponement of guilt
- Self-blame (psychology)
