= Alibi =

Defence of being elsewhere when a crime happened

An alibi (/ˈælɪbaɪ/, from the Latin, alibī, meaning "somewhere else") is a statement by a person under suspicion in a crime that they were in a different place when the offence was committed. During a police investigation, all suspects are usually asked to provide details of their whereabouts during the relevant time period, which, where possible, would usually be confirmed by other persons or in other ways (such as by checking phone records, or credit card receipts, use of CCTV, etc.).

During a criminal trial, an alibi is a defence raised by the accused as proof that they could not have committed the crime because they were in some other place at the time the alleged offence was committed. The Criminal Law Deskbook of Criminal Procedure states: "Alibi is different from all of the other defences; it is based upon the premise that the defendant is truly innocent."

== Duty to disclose ==
In some legal jurisdictions there may be a requirement that the accused disclose an alibi defence prior to the trial. This is to enable the investigators to verify whether or not such a claim is true. This is an exception to the rule that a criminal defendant cannot normally be compelled to furnish information to the prosecution. Since the alibi involves evidence of innocence rather than guilt, the privilege against self-incrimination is not implicated.

In Canada, the defence must disclose an alibi defence with sufficient time for the authorities to investigate the alibi, and with sufficient particularization to allow for a meaningful investigation. Failure to comply with the two requirements will result in the court making an adverse inference against the alibi defence (but will not result in the exclusion of the alibi defence).

Conversely, some judges in other jurisdictions have held the opinion that the mandatory early disclosure of alibis is unfair, possibly even unconstitutional.

== False alibi ==
The giving of a false alibi, beside resulting in possible subsequent criminal offences (obstruction of justice, perjury, etc.), may, in some jurisdictions, result in negative ramifications for the trial itself, as it may be considered evidence of consciousness of guilt.

In Canada, the giving of a false alibi may be used by the court as actual evidence of guilt, provided certain requirements are met. Specifically:

- The alibi must not be believed;
- There is evidence of an intention to fabricate the alibi that is independent from the evidence used to show the alibi is false; and
- The court must reject all innocent explanations offered that would explain why a false alibi was fabricated.

== Alibi agency ==
An alibi agency, also called an alibi network, forges explanations for unexcused absences, e.g. due to an extramarital affair or adultery. In other words, alibi agencies are paid to lie for their customers. Originating in 1990s Japan, such services appeared in Europe in 2004, where they were condemned as immoral by the Catholic Church in Germany. They are the subject of the 2006 movie The Alibi.
