= John Haiman =

American linguist (1946–2025)

John Michael Haiman (31 Jan 1946 – 7 April 2025) was an American linguist and professor emeritus at Macalester College. He did fieldwork on the Hua language of Papua New-Guinea and published on Khmer, Rhaeto-Romance and Germanic linguistics. In 1989 he received a Guggenheim fellowship for the study of sarcasm.

He graduated from the University of Toronto (BA) and Harvard University (PhD).
