= Rod and frame test =

The rod and frame test is a psychophysical method of testing perception. It relies on the use of a rod and frame apparatus which uses a rotating rod set inside an individually rotatable drum, allowing an experimenter to vary the participant's frame of reference and thus test for their perception of vertical.

== Rod and frame illusion ==
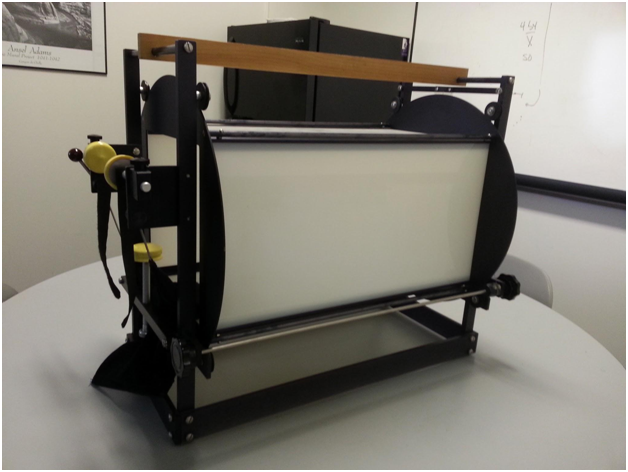
Picture 1. A picture taken of the Rod and Frame apparatus originally sold by the Stoelting company, and now owned by the Rochester Institute of Technology.

The rod and frame illusion occurs because of the effect of the orientation of the frame on the rod. In the simplest example of the rod and frame illusion, the illusion will cause the participant to perceive the rod to be oriented congruent with the orientation of the frame. When the participant is viewing the rod and frame that are both positioned at 0 degrees (or vertical), they perceive the rod as vertical with perfect accuracy. However, when the frame is tilted away from vertical, the participant's perception of vertical is affected. The participant tends to perceive the rod to be tilted in the same direction as the frame is oriented (e.g., if the frame is tilted in the counterclockwise direction, the rod will also be perceived as being tilted counterclockwise). As the tilt of the frame increases, the participants' perceived vertical increasingly deviates from true vertical.

== Rod and frame test ==
To perform the rod and frame task, an apparatus consisting of a rod in a square frame is used. An example commercial apparatus can be seen in picture 1. When the participant is being tested using the apparatus, their head is fastened firmly in the chin rest to prevent the participant from collecting visual cues from outside of the apparatus. The rod and frame are shown in the center of the far end of the apparatus, which provides a frame of reference to the participant. Both the participant and the experimenter are able to adjust the orientation of the rod, while only the experimenter can adjust the frame orientation by using the appropriate knobs on the apparatus, as seen in picture 2. The experimenter is able to see the exact degree measurement of the rod and frame from vertical, while the participant sees the physical rod and frame inside the apparatus.

The methods of constant stimuli, limits, and adjustment can be used to test the participants, but method of limits is most commonly used in research conducted using the rod and frame task. When using the method of limits, the experimenter sets the orientation of the rod and frame separately and then the participant is asked to adjust the rod orientation until they perceive it to be vertical. Deviation from true vertical can then be determined. Based on which way the frame is tilted, the rod can be viewed as either being tilted in the same direction as the frame (direct effect), or in the opposite direction of the frame (indirect effect).

== Evidence ==
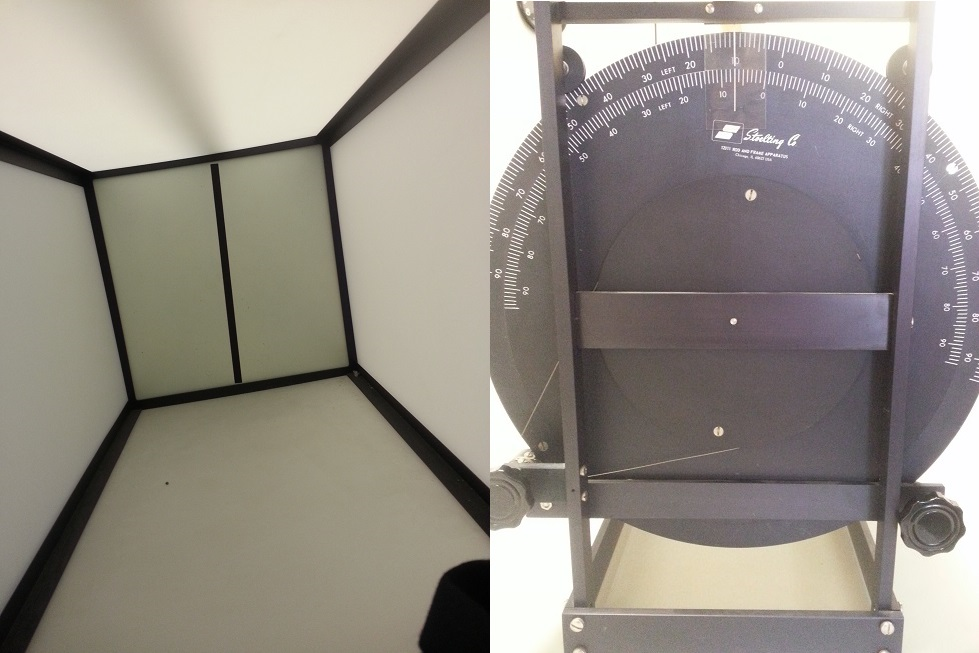
Picture 2. An image showing a 10-degree frame angle and a 7-degree rod angle. Observers using the apparatus see the rod as vertically oriented. The frame of the page, image border, etc. make it appear tilted here.

The frame of reference with respect to studies of the visual system refers to perceived reference axes. In the rod and frame illusion, there are a number of things that can influence one's frame of reference. Past research has found that one reason people experience the rod and frame illusion is due to visual-vestibular interactions. For instance, when a participant is viewing the rod and frame task while physically tilted, the participant acts as though they are tilted opposite of the orientation of the frame. This suggests that the illusion, in part, is due to the person compensating for their perceived vertical in the direction that is opposite of the frame. Other evidence proposed by researchers that is consistent with this is that, when participants are put on their sides to view the rod and frame task, they rely on their vision when their vestibular and proprioceptive senses are incongruent with those of their visual senses. These findings suggest that the rod and frame illusion is processed in a type of hierarchy, where visual input is at the top, then vestibular cues, and finally proprioceptive cues. In 2010, Lipshits found that, along with this hierarchy of processing, proprioceptive information, as opposed to gravity, is used by the body to determine which way is vertical. Lipshits says that, when we are not able to use vision to determine which way is vertical, we use other cues based on the axis of our head and body.

== See also ==
- Visual perception
- Field dependence
