= William Linn Westermann =

American historian and papyrologist (1873–1954)

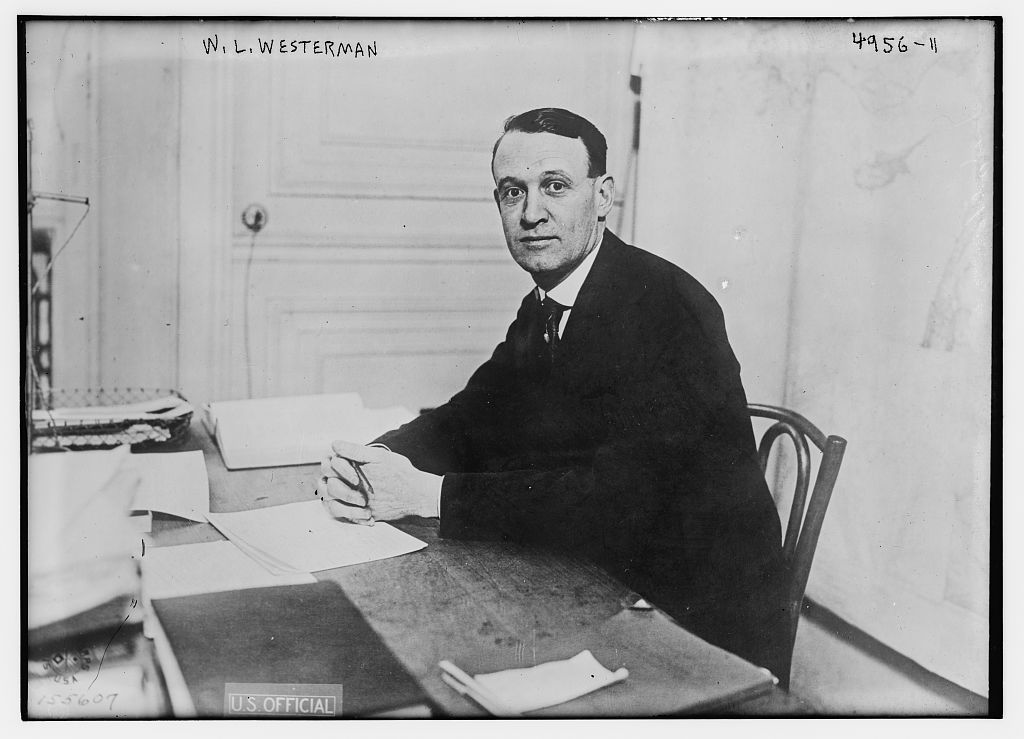
William Linn Westermann in 1919

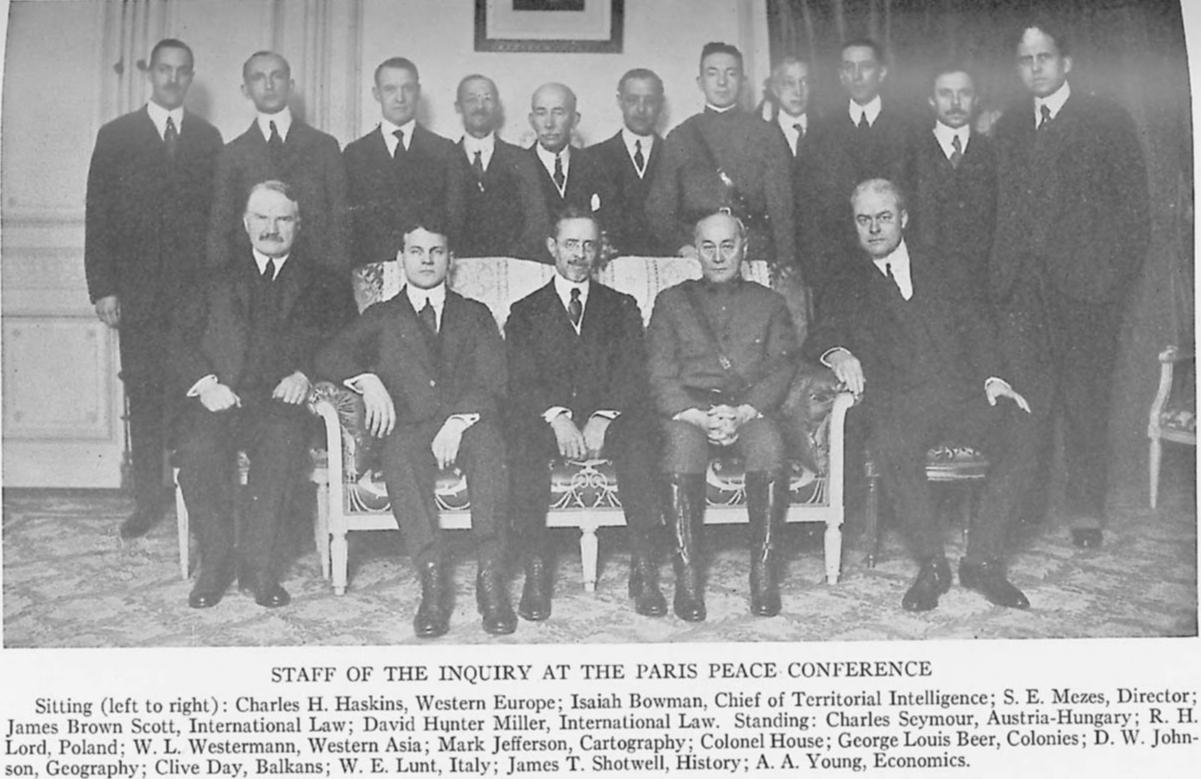
Westermann (standing in back row, third from left) with some members of The Inquiry

William Linn Westermann (September 15, 1873 – October 4, 1954) was an American historian and papyrologist who served as the president of the American Historical Association in 1944. He was regarded as an expert on the economy of the ancient world.

== Career ==
Westermann was born in Belleville, Illinois, and attended the University of Nebraska and University of Berlin. He taught at the University of Missouri from 1902 to 1906, then left for the University of Minnesota. In 1908, Westermann joined the faculty of the University of Wisconsin. He spent twelve years of his academic career in Wisconsin, moving to Cornell University in 1920. He was appointed professor of ancient history at Columbia University on March 5, 1923. During his tenure at Columbia, Westermann acquired a large collection of Ancient Egyptian papyri for the institution. His scholarly reputation rests on his book Slave Systems of Greek and Roman Antiquity, published posthumously in 1955. His most prominent pupil was Moses I. Finley, arguably the most influential ancient historian in the world from he 1960s to the 1980s and still an inspiration. Westermann retired in 1948 to become a visiting professor at the University of Alexandria in Egypt. For more on Westermann's scholarly life see above all the article devoted to him in the American National Biography XXIII (1999), by W. V. Harris.

Westermann was appointed to the American Commission to Negotiate Peace as specialist on questions relating to Western Asia. He advised President Woodrow Wilson on Greek and Turkish events at the Paris Peace Conference of 1919. He was a member of the American Academy in Rome's Broad of Trustees from 1922 to 1933. He was elected to the American Philosophical Society in 1944.

== Personal life ==
Westermann, a descendant of William and Sharon Tyndale, died at White Plains Hospital in White Plains, New York on October 4, 1954. His wife, Avrina Davies Westermann, whom he married on June 15, 1912, died on December 21, 1960. They had one son, Evan Davies Westermann, (1914–1991) who attended the Scarsdale public schools, Phillips Exeter Academy, graduated from Harvard University, and worked for the New York Department of Commerce. He married Virginia Woodworth on August 4, 1942, and had two children.
