= Herman Witkin =

American psychologist (1916–1979)

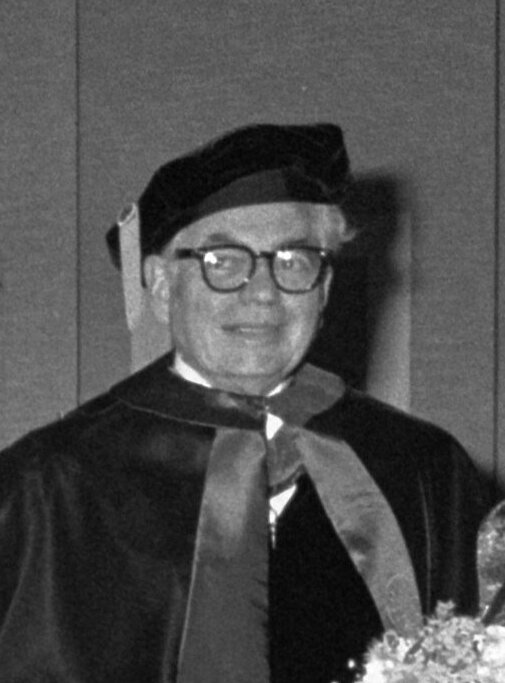
- Witkin in 1977
- Born: August 2, 1916; New York City, US
- Died: July 7, 1979 (aged 62)
- Education: New York University

Herman A. Witkin (August 2, 1916 – July 8, 1979) was an American psychologist who pioneered the development of cognitive theories, especially as they pertained to learning. While many cognitive psychologists diagnosed learning disabilities with questionnaires, he preferred projective tests and problem-solving exercises. He proposed the concept of field-dependency vs. field-independency. The majority of Witkin's research was done during his tenures at the SUNY Downstate Medical Center College of Medicine in Brooklyn, New York, and at Educational Testing Service (ETS) in Princeton, New Jersey, where he worked until his death in 1979. A Review of General Psychology survey, published in 2002, ranked Witkin as the 96th most cited psychologist of the 20th century.

Witkin studied differences in perceptual style for almost 30 years. His first book was titled Personality Through Perception (1954). The idea in this book was that personality can be revealed through differences in how people perceive their environment. Witkin was at first interested in the cues that people use in judging orientation in space. What makes one know that what one sees is a tilted object and that it is not you who are tilted? For one to find a conclusion, one examines other objects in the surroundings.

== Biography ==
Witkin was born on August 2, 1916, in New York City. He enrolled in Cornell University but transferred to New York University where he received a BA in biology. He continued at NYU where he earned a master's degree while studying behavior. He earned a doctorate in psychology and worked with gestalt psychologist Wolfgang Kohler. He explored perception and developed his theories in field dependence and independence.

Witkin studied differences in perceptual style for almost 30 years. His first book was titled Personality Through Perception (1954). The idea in this book was that personality can be revealed through differences in how people perceive their environment. Witkin was at first interested in the cues that people use in judging orientation in space. What makes one know that what one sees is a tilted object and that it is not you who are tilted? For one to find a conclusion, one examines other objects in the surroundings. In 1940 Witkin became an instructor at Brooklyn College and conducted cognitive and perceptual research on space orientation, particularly on how people determine the upright in space. Inspired by Heinz Werner, Witkin organized his research regarding the cognitive styles of individuals, groups, and sex differences.

== Research ==
In 1948, Witkin and Asch developed an apparatus called the Rod and Frame Test (RFT). When using the RFT, the participant sits in a darkened room where he or she receives instructions about watching a glowing rod surrounded by a glowing square frame. The researcher can manipulate both the rod, the frame, and the participant's chair in different angles of tilts. The participant is then instructed to adjust the rod so that the rod is perfectly upright. For the participant to be able to do this, he/she has to ignore cues in the visual field. If the participant adjusts the rod so that it is leaning in the direction of the tilted frame, then that person is said to be dependent on the visual field. This person will be categorized as field-dependent. On the other side there will be people who are field-independent. These people will disregard the external cues, and use information from their bodies in adjusting the rod to appear upright. Field-independent people seem to rely on their own sensations instead of the perception of the field, to make a judgment.

The RFT is a difficult and time-consuming method for revealing field dependence and -independence. Witkin, therefore, developed the Embedded Figures Test (EFT). This test also measures field dependence without relying on the cumbersome Rod and Frame Test. An example of an EFT is a picture with many hidden figures which you are supposed to find. Field-independent people will quickly be able to find the hidden figures, while field-dependent people will have trouble locating the simple figures embedded within the more complex surroundings. Witkin found a strong correlation between the Performance on the EFT.

Field independence-dependence has been linked to many traits. People who are field dependent have many more utterances per unit time in conversation with other field dependent people than do field independent people. Field-dependent folks have better memories for faces. Field-independent people have better memories for numbers.

One paradigm experiment involved college students. In the experiment, the subject arrived late (by premeditation) at a psychology experiment in which the other 'subjects' were asked to rate whether two lines were of equal length or unequal. The only seat for the subject was at the end of the semi-circle of other subjects, all of whom had been prompted how to respond to the prompt. Even when the lines were of clearly unequal length, the 'stooges' replied that the lines were of equal length. Subjects who were field-dependent also agreed that the lines were equal. Field independent subjects asserted the lines were unequal, even when the differences were very small.

Field independence-dependence has been demonstrated in many cultures worldwide and appears to be bi-modal, although with advancing age it appears to drift toward the middle of the distribution.

After Witkin's death, little research was done on field independence-dependence. However, new research began to appear at the beginning of the 1990s. Among the contributors were Vrij, van der Steen & Koppelaar (1995) and Linda Bastone and Heather Wood (1997).
