= Cognitive style =

Concept in cognitive psychology

Cognitive style or thinking style is a concept used in cognitive psychology to describe the way individuals think, perceive and remember information. Cognitive style differs from cognitive ability (or level), the latter being measured by aptitude tests or so-called intelligence tests. There is controversy over the exact meaning of the term "cognitive style" and whether it is a single or multiple dimension of human personality. However it remains a key concept in the areas of education and management. If a pupil has a cognitive style that is similar to that of his/her teacher, the chances are improved that the pupil will have a more positive learning experience (Kirton, 2003). Likewise, team members with similar cognitive styles likely feel more positive about their participation with the team (Kirton, 2003). While matching cognitive styles may make participants feel more comfortable when working with one another, this alone cannot guarantee the success of the outcome.

== Multi-dimensional models and measures ==
Riding (1991) developed a two-dimensional cognitive style instrument, his Cognitive Style Analysis (CSA), which is a compiled computer-presented test that measures individuals' position on two orthogonal dimensions – Wholist-Analytic (W-A) and Verbal-Imagery (V-I). The W-A dimension reflects how individuals organise and structure information. Individuals described as Analytics will deconstruct information into its component parts, whereas individuals described as Wholists will retain a global or overall view of information. The V–I dimension describes individuals' mode of information representation in memory during thinking – Verbalisers represent information in words or verbal associations, and Imagers represent information in mental pictures. The CSA test is broken down into three sub-tests, all of which are based on a comparison between response times to different types of stimulus items. Some scholars argue that this instrument, being at least in part reliant on the ability of the respondent to answer at speed, really measures a mix of cognitive style and cognitive ability (Kirton, 2003). This is said to contribute to the unreliability of this instrument.

== Bipolar, one-dimensional models and measures ==
The field dependence-independence model, invented by Herman Witkin, identifies an individual's perceptive behaviour while distinguishing object figures from the content field in which they are set. Two similar instruments to do this were produced, the Embedded Figures Test (EFT) and the Group Embedded Figures Test (GEFT) (1971). In both cases, the content field is a distracting or confusing background. These instruments are designed to distinguish field-independent from field-dependent cognitive types; a rating which is claimed to be value-neutral. Field-independent people tend to be more autonomous when it comes to the development of restructuring skills; that is, those skills required during technical tasks with which the individual is not necessarily familiar. They are, however, less autonomous in the development of interpersonal skills. Cultural psychologists have used measures of field dependence to measure differences across countries, finding more field dependence in Japan than the United States and even between social conservatives versus liberals within a single country.

The EFT and GEFT continue to enjoy support and usage in research and practice. However, they, too, are criticised by scholars as containing an element of ability and so may not measure cognitive style alone. Some measures of field dependence try to equate for ability by giving people separate measures of dependence and independence and then measuring the difference between the two. Theoretically, this should allow researchers to separate general ability from style (relative performance on the independence task versus the dependence task).

Liam Hudson (Carey, 1991) identified two cognitive styles: convergent thinkers, good at accumulating material from a variety of sources relevant to a problem's solution, and divergent thinkers who proceed more creatively and subjectively in their approach to problem-solving. Hudson's Converger-diverger construct attempts to measure the processing rather than the acquisition of information by an individual. It aims to differentiate convergent from divergent thinkers; the former being persons who think rationally and logically while the latter tend to be more flexible and to base reasoning more on heuristic evidence.

In contrast, cognitive complexity theories as proposed by James Bieri (1961) attempt to identify individuals who are more complex in their approach to problem-solving against those who are simpler. The instruments used to measure this concept of "cognitive style" are either Driver's Decision Style Exercise (DDSE) (Carey, 1991) or the Complexity Self-Test Description Instrument, which are somewhat ad hoc and so are little used at present.

Gordon Pask (Carey, 1991) extended these notions in a discussion of strategies and styles of learning. In this, he classifies learning strategies as either holist or serialist. When confronted with an unfamiliar type of problem, holists gather information randomly within a framework, while serialists approach problem-solving step-wise, proceeding from the known to the unknown.

Robert Ornstein's Hemispherical lateralisation concept (Carey, 1991), commonly called left-brain/right-brain theory, posits that the left hemisphere of the brain controls logical and analytical operations while the right hemisphere controls holistic, intuitive and pictorial activities. Cognitive style is thus claimed to be a single dimension on a scale from extreme left-brain to extreme right-brain types, depending on which associated behaviour dominates in the individual, and by how much.

Taggart's (1988) "Whole-brain human information processing theory" classifies the brain as having six divisions, three per hemisphere, which in a sense is a refined model of the hemispherical lateralisation theory discussed above.

The Allinson-Hayes (1996) Cognitive Style Index (CSI) has features of Ornstein's left-brain/right-brain theory. Recent evidence suggests that it may be the most widely used measure of cognitive style in academic research in the fields of management and education (Cools, Armstrong and Verbrigghe, 2014; Evans, Cools and Charlesworth, 2010). The CSI contains 38 items, each rated using a 3-point scale (true; uncertain; false). Certain scholars have questioned its construct validity on the grounds of theoretical and methodological approaches associated with its development. Allinson and Hayes (2012), however, have refuted these claims on the basis of other independent studies of its psychometric properties. Research has indicated both gender and cultural differences in CSI scores. While this may complicate some management and educational applications, previous investigations have suggested it is entirely plausible that cognitive style is related to these social factors.

== Kirton's model of cognitive style ==
Another popular model of cognitive style was devised by Michael Kirton (1976, 2003). His model, called Adaption-Innovation theory, claims that an individual's preferred approach to problem solving, can be placed on a continuum ranging from high adaptation to high innovation. He suggests that some human beings, called adaptors tend to prefer the adaptive approach to problem-solving, while others (innovators), of course, prefer the reverse. Adaptors use what is given to solve problems by time-honoured techniques. Alternatively, innovators look beyond what is given to solve problems with the aid of innovative technologies. Kirton suggests that while adaptors prefer to do well within a given paradigm, innovators would rather do differently, thereby striving to transcend existing paradigms.

Kirton also invented an instrument to measure cognitive style (at least in accordance with this model) known as the Kirton Adaption-innovation Inventory (KAI). This requires the respondent to rate themselves against thirty-two personality traits. A drawback of all the other efforts to measure cognitive style discussed above is their failure to separate out cognitive style and cognitive level. As the items on the KAI are expressed in clear and simple language, cognitive level plays no significant role. Scores on the A-I continuum are normally distributed between the extreme cognitive styles of high innovation and high adaptation.

Another important concept associated with A-I theory is that of bridging in teams. Kirton (2003) defines bridging as "reaching out to people in the team and helping them be part of it so that they may contribute even if their contribution is outside the mainstream". Bridging is thus a task and a role, which has to be learnt. It is not a cognitive style. Bridging is also not leading, although the skilled leader may make use of persons they recognise as good bridgers to maintain group cohesion. Group cohesion means, to keep the group aware of the importance of its members working well together. Kirton (2003) suggests that it is easier for a person to learn and assume a bridging role if their cognitive style is an intermediate one. If person B assumes a bridging role which assists persons A and C to work well together in a team, then B's KAI score is recommended to be between those of A and C. Of course, it is only recommended that B's score lies between the scores of A and C, not that B's score lies near the KAI mean. All of A, B and C could be high-scoring innovators or, for that matter, high-scoring adaptors.

== See also ==
- Barnum effect or Forer effect
- Computer user satisfaction § Cognitive style
- Differential psychology
- Fluid and crystallized intelligence
- Learning styles
- List of thought processes
