= Social cognitive neuroscience =

Use of neuroscience in study of social cognition

Social cognitive neuroscience is the scientific study of the biological processes underpinning social cognition. Specifically, it uses the tools of neuroscience to study "the mental mechanisms that create, frame, regulate, and respond to our experience of the social world". Social cognitive neuroscience uses the epistemological foundations of cognitive neuroscience, and is closely related to social neuroscience. Social cognitive neuroscience employs human neuroimaging, typically using functional magnetic resonance imaging (fMRI). Human brain stimulation techniques such as transcranial magnetic stimulation and transcranial direct-current stimulation are also used. In nonhuman animals, direct electrophysiological recordings and electrical stimulation of single cells and neuronal populations are utilized for investigating lower-level social cognitive processes.

== History and methods ==
The first scholarly works about the neural bases of social cognition can be traced back to Phineas Gage, a man who survived a traumatic brain injury in 1849 and was extensively studied for resultant changes in social functioning and personality. In 1924, esteemed psychologist Gordon Allport wrote a chapter on the neural bases of social phenomenon in his textbook of social psychology. However, these works did not generate much activity in the decades that followed.

Inventions in the study of neuronal activity provided the groundwork for field development. In 1924, German physiologist and psychiatrist Hans Berger (1873–1941) recorded the electrical activity of the brain by inventing the first human electroencephalogram EEG. In 1953, Dr. Brownell and Dr. Aronow designed the first clinical positron imaging device, a prototype of a modern Positron Emission Tomography (PET). In 1971, American chemist and physicist Paul Christian Lauterbur invented the idea of MR imaging (MRI). Ph.D. in Chemistry, Michael E. Phelps developed the first PET scanner in 1973, based on discoveries of American scientists David Edmund Kuhl, Luke Chapman, and Roy Edwards, which constructed several tomographic instruments in the late 1950s.

The beginning of modern social cognitive neuroscience can be traced to Michael Gazzaniga's book, Social Brain (1985), which attributed cerebral lateralization to the peculiarities of social psychological phenomenon. Isolated pockets of social cognitive neuroscience research emerged in the late 1980s to the mid-1990s, mostly using single-unit electrophysiological recordings in nonhuman primates or neuropsychological lesion studies in humans. During this time, the closely related field of social neuroscience emerged in parallel, however it mostly focused on how social factors influenced autonomic, neuroendocrine, and immune systems. In 1996, Giacomo Rizzolatti's group made one of the most seminal discoveries in social cognitive neuroscience: the existence of mirror neurons in macaque frontoparietal cortex. The mid-1990s saw the emergence of functional positron emission tomography (PET) for humans, which enabled the neuroscientific study of abstract (and perhaps uniquely human, but this issue is still a subject of debate) social cognitive functions such as theory of mind and mentalizing. However, PET is prohibitively expensive and requires the ingestion of radioactive tracers, thus limiting its adoption.

In the year 2000, the term social cognitive neuroscience was coined by Matthew Lieberman and Kevin Ochsner, who are from social and cognitive psychology backgrounds, respectively. This was done to integrate and brand the isolated labs doing research on the neural bases of social cognition. Also in the year 2000, Elizabeth Phelps and colleagues published the first fMRI study on social cognition, specifically on race evaluations. The adoption of fMRI, a less expensive and noninvasive neuroimaging modality, induced explosive growth in the field. In 2001, the first academic conference on social cognitive neuroscience was held at University of California, Los Angeles. The mid-2000s saw the emergence of academic societies related to the field (Social and Affective Neuroscience Society, Society for Social Neuroscience), as well as peer-reviewed journals specialized for the field (Social Cognitive and Affective Neuroscience, Social Neuroscience). In the 2000s and beyond, labs conducting social cognitive neuroscience research proliferated throughout Europe, North America, East Asia, Australasia, and South America.

Starting in the late 2000s, the field began to expand its methodological repertoire by incorporating other neuroimaging modalities (e.g. electroencephalography, magnetoencephalography, functional near-infrared spectroscopy), advanced computational methods (e.g. multivariate pattern analysis, causal modeling, graph theory), and brain stimulation techniques (e.g. transcranial magnetic stimulation, transcranial direct-current stimulation, deep brain stimulation). Due to the volume and rigor of research in the field, the 2010s saw social cognitive neuroscience achieving mainstream acceptance in the wider fields of neuroscience and psychology.

Hyperscanning or inter-brain research is becoming the most frequent approach to studying social cognition. It is thought that exploring the correlation of neuronal activities of two or more brains in shared cognitive tasks can contribute to understanding the relationship between social experiences and neurophysiological processes. In 2024, inspired by research on interpersonal neural synchronization and neuroscience studies on fetal brain responses to auditory stimuli that revealed increased neuronal activity in the fetal brain when it was exposed to an unfamiliar voice stimuli, the mother-fetus neurocognitive model hypothesis has been put forward opening a new research direction. According to this position, interpersonal neurophysiological processes within the biological system of this dyad provide the fetal nervous system with training for proper reactions to stimuli at the onset of cognition. The hypothesis has shown that training is successful because of neural synchronization between nervous systems that occurs through the interference of local neuronal oscillations with the low-frequency electromagnetic field of the mother's heart.

== Functional anatomy ==
Much of social cognition is primarily subserved by two dissociable macro-scale brain networks: the mirror neuron system (MNS) and default mode network (DMN). MNS is thought to represent and identify observable actions (e.g. reaching for a cup) that are used by DMN to infer unobservable mental states, traits, and intentions (e.g. thirsty). Concordantly, the activation onset of MNS has been shown to precede DMN during social cognition. However, the extent of feedforward, feedback, and recurrent processing within and between MNS and DMN is not yet well-characterized, thus it is difficult to fully dissociate the exact functions of the two networks and their nodes.

=== Mirror neuron system (MNS) ===
Mirror neurons, first discovered in macaque frontoparietal cortex, fire when actions are either performed or observed. In humans, similar sensorimotor "mirroring" responses have been found in the brain regions listed below, which are collectively referred to as MNS. The MNS has been found to identify and represent intentional actions such as facial expressions, body language, and grasping. MNS may encode the concept of an action, not just the sensory and motor information associated with an action. As such, MNS representations have been shown to be invariant of how an action is observed (e.g. sensory modality) and how an action is performed (e.g. left versus right hand, upwards or downwards). MNS has even been found to represent actions that are described in written language.

Mechanistic theories of MNS functioning fall broadly into two camps: motor and cognitive theories. Classical motor theories posit that abstract action representations arise from simulating actions within the motor system, while newer cognitive theories propose that abstract action representations arise from the integration of multiple domains of information: perceptual, motor, semantic, and conceptual. Aside from these competing theories, there are more fundamental controversies surrounding the human MNS – even the very existence of mirror neurons in this network is debated. As such, the term "MNS" is sometimes eschewed for more functionally defined names such as "action observation network", "action identification network", and "action representation network".

The hypothesis of the mother-fetus neurocognitive model (MFN) contributes to the theory of the MNS's role in social cognition. It has been shown that MNS mirror neurons are observed only in specific cases of interpersonal dynamics that meet the MFN model conditions. The MFN model is a representation of neurophysiological processes within the biological system of the Mother-Fetus dyad that provides the fetal nervous system with training for proper reactions to stimuli at the onset of cognition. It has been shown that local neuronal oscillations in both nervous systems are synchronized through interference with the low-frequency electromagnetic field of the mother's heart. So that the mother's heart oscillations synchronize the brain oscillations of already excited central and peripheral neuronal ensembles, similar in both organisms, due to physiological entrainment within the shared ecosystem. Therefore, the activation of specific sensorimotor networks in the mother entrains those in the child, and, because of the shared ecosystem, this engagement trains the young nervous system to respond correctly to certain sensory stimuli through statistical mechanisms based on numerous successful and unsuccessful trials. This entrainment provides subliminal perception in the young organism, similar to the Mother's intentional act that initiates the process of cognition.

==== Premotor cortex ====
Mirror neurons were first discovered in macaque premotor cortex. The premotor cortex is associated with a diverse array of functions, encompassing low-level motor control, motor planning, sensory guidance of movement, along with higher level cognitive functions such as language processing and action comprehension. The premotor cortex has been found to contain subregions with unique cytoarchitectural properties, the significance of which is not yet fully understood. In humans, sensorimotor mirroring responses are also found throughout premotor cortex and adjacent sections of inferior frontal gyrus and supplementary motor area.

Visuospatial information is more prevalent in ventral premotor cortex than dorsal premotor cortex. In humans, sensorimotor mirroring responses extend beyond ventral premotor cortex into adjacent regions of inferior frontal gyrus, including Broca's area, an area that is critical to language processing and speech production. Action representations in inferior frontal gyrus can be evoked by language, such as action verbs, in addition to the observed and performed actions typically used as stimuli in biological motion studies. The overlap between language and action understanding processes in inferior frontal gyrus has spurred some researchers to suggest overlapping neurocomputational mechanisms between the two. Dorsal premotor cortex is strongly associated with motor preparation and guidance, such as representing multiple motor choices and deciding the final selection of action.

==== Intraparietal sulcus ====
Classical studies of action observation have found mirror neurons in macaque intraparietal sulcus. In humans, sensorimotor mirroring responses are centered around the anterior intraperietal sulcus, with responses also seen in adjacent regions such as inferior parietal lobule and superior parietal lobule. Intraparietal sulcus has been shown to more sensitive to the motor features of biological motion, relative to semantic features. Intraparietal sulcus has been shown to encode magnitude in a domain-general manner, whether it be the magnitude of a motor movement, or the magnitude of a person's social status. Intraparietal sulcus is considered a part of the dorsal visual stream, but is also thought to receive inputs from non-dorsal stream regions such as lateral occipitotemporal cortex and posterior superior temporal sulcus.

==== Lateral occipitotemporal cortex (LOTC) ====
LOTC encompasses lateral regions of the visual cortex such as V5 and extrastriate body area. Though LOTC is typically associated with visual processing, sensorimotor mirroring responses and abstract action representations are reliably found in this region. LOTC includes cortical areas that are sensitive to motion, objects, body parts, kinematics, body postures, observed movements, and semantic content in verbs. LOTC is thought to encode the fine sensorimotor details of an observed action (e.g. local kinematic and perceptual features). LOTC is also thought to bind together the different means by which a specific action can be carried out.

=== Default mode network (DMN) ===
The default mode network (DMN) is thought to process and represent abstract social information, such as mental states, traits, and intentions. Social cognitive functions such as theory of mind, mentalizing, emotion recognition, empathy, moral cognition, and social working memory consistently recruit DMN regions in human neuroimaging studies. Though the functional anatomy of these functions can differ, they often include the core DMN hubs of medial prefrontal cortex, posterior cingulate, and temporoparietal junction. Aside from social cognition, the DMN is broadly associated with internally directed cognition. The DMN has been found to be involved in memory-related processing (semantic, episodic, prospection), self-related processing (e.g. introspection), and mindwandering. Unlike studies of the mirror neuron system, task-based DMN investigations almost always use human subjects, as DMN-related social cognitive functions are rudimentary or difficult to measure in nonhumans. However, much of DMN activity occurs during rest, as DMN activation and connectivity are quickly engaged and sustained during the absence of goal-directed cognition. As such, the DMN is widely thought the subserve the "default mode" of mammalian brain function.

The interrelations between social cognition, rest, and the diverse array of DMN-related functions are not yet well understood and is a topic of active research. Social, non-social, and spontaneous processes in the DMN are thought to share at least some underlying neurocomputational mechanisms with each other.

==== Medial prefrontal cortex (mPFC) ====
Medial prefrontal cortex (mPFC) is strongly associated with abstract social cognition such as mentalizing and theory of mind. Mentalizing activates much of the mPFC, but dorsal mPFC appears to be more selective for information about other people, while anterior mPFC may be more selective for information about the self.

Ventral regions of mPFC, such as ventromedial prefrontal cortex and medial orbitofrontal cortex, are thought to play a critical role in the affective components of social cognition. For example, ventromedial prefrontal cortex has been found to represent affective information about other people. Ventral mPFC has been shown to be critical in the computation and representation of valence and value for many types of stimuli, not just social stimuli.

The mPFC may subserve the most abstract components of social cognition, as it is one of the most domain general brain regions, sits at the top of the cortical hierarchy, and is last to activate during DMN-related tasks.

==== Posterior cingulate cortex (PCC) ====
Abstract social cognition recruits a large area of posteromedial cortex centered around posterior cingulate cortex (PCC), but also extending into precuneus and retrosplenial cortex. The specific function of PCC in social cognition is not yet well characterized, and its role may be generalized and tightly linked with medial prefrontal cortex. One view is that PCC may help represent some visuospatial and semantic components of social cognition. Additionally, PCC may track social dynamics by facilitating bottom-up attention to behaviorally relevant sources of information in the external environment and in memory. Dorsal PCC is also linked to monitoring behaviorally relevant changes in the environment, perhaps aiding in social navigation. Outside of the social domain, PCC is associated with a very diverse array of functions, such as attention, memory, semantics, visual processing, mindwandering, consciousness, cognitive flexibility, and mediating interactions between brain networks.

==== Temporoparietal junction (TPJ) ====
The temporoparietal junction (TPJ) is thought to be critical to distinguishing between multiple agents, such as the self and other. The right TPJ is robustly activated by false belief tasks, in which subjects have to distinguish between others' beliefs and their own beliefs in a given situation. The TPJ is also recruited by the wide variety of abstract social cognitive tasks associated with the DMN. Outside of the social domain, TPJ is associated with a diverse array of functions such as attentional reorienting, target detection, contextual updating, language processing, and episodic memory retrieval. The social and non-social functions of the TPJ may share common neurocomputational mechanisms. For example, the substrates of attentional reorientation in TPJ may be used for reorienting attention between the self and others, and for attributing attention between social agents. Moreover, a common neural encoding mechanism has been found to instantiate social, temporal, and spatial distance in TPJ.

==== Superior temporal sulcus (STS) ====
Social tasks recruit areas of lateral temporal cortex centered around superior temporal sulcus (STS), but also extending to superior temporal gyrus, middle temporal gyrus, and the temporal poles. During social cognition, the anterior STS and temporal poles are strongly associated with abstract social cognition and person information, while the posterior STS is most associated with social vision and biological motion processing. The posterior STS is also thought to provide perceptual inputs to the mirror neuron system.

=== Other regions ===
There are also several brain regions that fall outside the MNS and DMN which are strongly associated with certain social cognitive functions.

==== Ventrolateral prefrontal cortex (VLPFC) ====
The ventrolateral prefrontal cortex (VLPFC) is associated with emotional and inhibitory processing. It has been found to be involved in emotion recognition from facial expressions, body language, prosody, and more. Specifically, it is thought to access semantic representations of emotional constructs during emotion recognition. Moreover, VLPFC is often recruited in empathy, mentalizing, and theory of mind tasks. VLPFC is thought to support the inhibition of self-perspective when thinking about other people.

==== Insula ====
The insula is critical to emotional processing and interoception. It has been found to be involved in emotion recognition, empathy, morality, and social pain. The anterior insula is thought to facilitate feeling the emotions of others, especially negative emotions such as vicarious pain. Lesions of the insula are associated with decreased empathy capacity. Anterior insula also activates during social pain, such as the pain caused by social rejection.

==== Anterior cingulate cortex (ACC) ====
The anterior cingulate cortex (ACC) is associated with emotional processing and error monitoring. The dorsal ACC appears to share some social cognitive functions to the anterior insula, such as facilitating feeling the emotions of others, especially negative emotions. The dorsal ACC also robustly activates during social pain, like the pain caused by being the victim of an injustice. The dorsal ACC is also associated with social evaluation, such as the detection and appraisal of social exclusion. The subgenual ACC has been found to activate for vicarious reward, and may be involved in prosocial behavior.

==== Fusiform face area (FFA) ====
The fusiform face area (FFA) is strongly associated with face processing and perceptual expertise. The FFA has been shown to process the visuospatial features of faces, and may also encode some semantic features of faces.

== Notable figures ==
- David Amodio
- Mahzarin Banaji
- John T. Cacioppo
- Jean Decety
- Robin Dunbar
- Naomi Eisenberger
- Uta Frith
- Chris Frith
- Michael Gazzaniga
- Joshua Greene (psychologist)
- Todd Heatherton
- Matthew Lieberman
- Jason Mitchell
- Elizabeth A. Phelps
- Giacomo Rizzolatti
- Rebecca Saxe
- Tania Singer

== See also ==
- Affective neuroscience
- Cognitive psychology
- Cognitive neuroscience
- Outline of brain mapping
- Outline of the human brain
- Motor cognition
- Neural Synchrony
- Social Cognitive and Affective Neuroscience (Journal)
- Social neuroscience
- Social Neuroscience (Journal)
- Social psychology
- Systems neuroscience
