= Broken heart =

Intense stress or pain one feels at experiencing longing

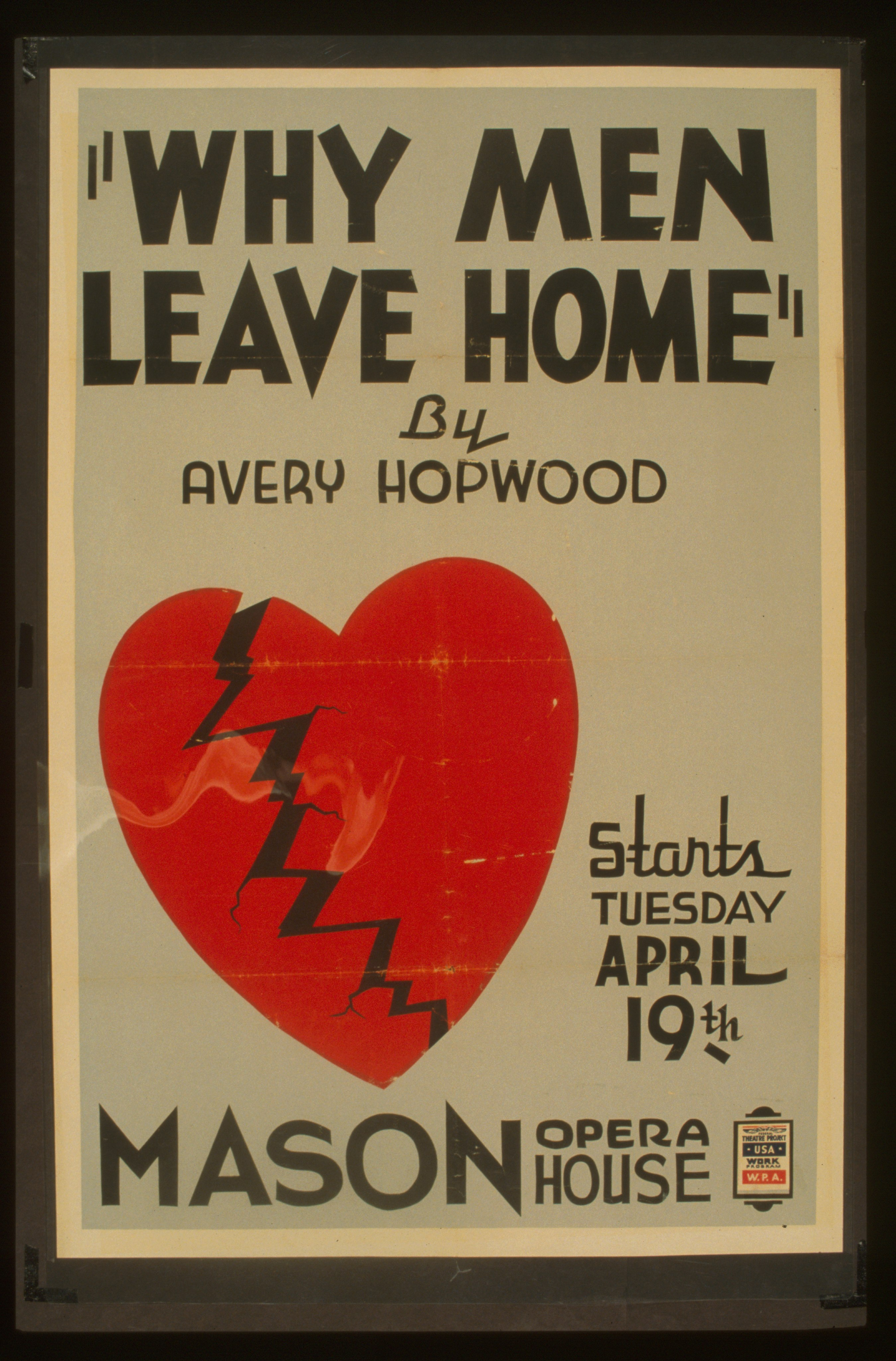
1938 poster for an adaptation of Avery Hopwood's Why Men Leave Home, showing a physically cracked heart symbol as a metaphor for unhappiness in love.

A broken heart (also known as heartbreak or heartache) is a metaphor for the intense emotional stress or pain one feels at experiencing great loss or deep longing. It is often greatly associated with grief and mourning especially following the death of a loved one. The concept is cross-cultural, often cited with reference to unreciprocated or lost love.

Failed romantic love or unrequited love can be extremely painful; people suffering from a broken heart may succumb to depression, grief, anxiety and, in more extreme cases, post-traumatic stress disorder.

Studies show that the pain of heartbreak is registered in the brain the same as physical pain. Love is also addictive; when heartbreak happens, dopamine and oxytocin levels drop and are replaced with cortisol—contributing to mental and physical symptoms of heartbreak.

== Physiology ==
The intense pain of a broken heart is believed to be part of the survival instinct. The "social-attachment system" uses the "pain system" to encourage humans to maintain their close social relationships by causing pain when those relationships are lost. Psychologists Geoff MacDonald of the University of Queensland and Mark Leary of Wake Forest University proposed in 2005 the evolution of common mechanisms for both physical and emotional pain responses and argue that such expressions are "more than just a metaphor". The concept is believed to be universal, with many cultures using the same words to describe both physical pain and the feelings associated with relationship loss.

The neurological process involved in the perception of heartache is not known, but is thought to involve the anterior cingulate cortex of the brain, which during stress may overstimulate the vagus nerve causing pain, nausea or muscle tightness in the chest. Research by Naomi Eisenberger and Matthew Lieberman of the University of California from 2008 showed that rejection is associated with activation of the dorsal anterior cingulate cortex and right-ventral pre-frontal cortex, areas established as being involved in processing of pain, including empathizing with pain experienced by others. The same researchers mention effect of social stressors on the heart, and personality on perception of pain.

A 2011 study showed that the same regions of the brain that become active in response to painful sensory experiences are activated during intense social rejection or social loss in general. Social psychologist Ethan Kross from University of Michigan, who was heavily involved in the study, said, "These results give new meaning to the idea that social rejection hurts". The research implicates the secondary somatosensory cortex and the dorsal posterior insula.

== Psychology ==
=== Uncomplicated grief ===
For most bereaved individuals, the journey through grief will ultimately culminate in an acceptable level of adjustment to a life without their loved one. The Kübler-Ross model postulates that there are five stages of grief after the loss of a loved-one: denial, anger, bargaining, depression and acceptance. And while it is recognized that mourners go through an initial period of numbness leading to depression and finally to reorganization and recovery, most modern grief specialists recognize the variations and fluidity of grief experiences differ considerably in intensity and length among cultural groups, individually from person to person as well as depending on the amount of investment put into the relationship.

Ruminating, or having intrusive thoughts that are continuous, uncontrollable, and distressing, is often a component of grieving. John Bowlby's concept of "searching for the lost object" is about the anxiety and mounting frustration as the mourner remains lost, frequently sifting through memories of the departed, and perhaps fleeting perceptions of spectral visitations by the lost individual. When the loss involves "being left" or "unrequited love", in addition to the above, this mental searching is accompanied by obsessive thoughts about factors leading to the breakup, and possibilities for reuniting with the lost individual. In cases of rejection, shame may also be involved – the painful feeling of being unacceptable, disposable, or unworthy.

The physical signs of grieving include:

- Exhaustion, muscle tightness or weakness, body pains, fidgety restlessness, lack of energy
- Insomnia, sleeping too much, disturbing dreams
- Loss of appetite, overeating, nausea, "hollow stomach", indigestion, intestinal disorders like diarrhea, excessive weight gain or loss
- Headaches, shortness of breath, chest pressure, tightness or heaviness in the throat

=== Depression ===
A broken heart is a major stressor and has been found to precipitate episodes of major depression. In one study (death of a spouse), 24% of mourners were depressed at two months, 23% at seven months, 16% at 13 months and 14% at 25 months.

Although there are overlapping symptoms, uncomplicated grief can be distinguished from a full depressive episode. Major depression tends to be more pervasive and is characterized by significant difficulty in experiencing self-validating and positive feelings. Major depression is composed of a recognizable and stable cluster of debilitating symptoms, accompanied by a protracted, enduring low mood. It tends to be persistent and associated with poor work and social functioning, pathological immunological function, and other neurobiological changes unless treated.

In relationship breakups, mourners may turn their anger over the rejection toward themselves. This can deepen their depression and cause narcissistic wounding. The process of self-attack can range from mild self-doubt to scathing self-recrimination which leaves a lasting imprint on an individual's self-worth and causes them to doubt their lovability, personality-efficacy, and attachment worthiness going forward.

=== Psychological trauma ===
In severe cases, the depression of a broken heart can create a sustained type of stress that constitutes an emotional trauma which can be severe enough to leave an emotional imprint on individuals' psychobiological functioning, affecting future choices and responses to rejection, loss, or disconnection. A contributing factor to the trauma-producing event is that 'being left' can trigger primal separation fear – the fear of being left with no one to take care of one's vital needs.

Mourners may also experience the intense stress of helplessness. If they make repeated attempts to compel their loved one to return and are unsuccessful, they will feel helpless and inadequate to the task. Feeling one's "limited capacity" can produce a fault line in the psyche which renders the person prone to heightened emotional responses within primary relationships.

Another factor contributing to the traumatic conditions is the stress of losing someone with whom the mourner has come to rely in ways they did not realize. For instance, in time, couples can become external regulators for one another, attuned on many levels: pupils dilated in synchrony, echoing one another's speech patterns, movements, and even cardiac and EEG rhythms. Couples can function like a mutual bio-feedback system, stimulating and modulating each other's biorhythms, responding to one another's pheromones, and be addicted due to the steady trickle of endogenous opiates induced by the relationship.

=== Post-traumatic stress disorder ===
Research has shown that in extreme cases, some who experience a broken heart go on to develop post-traumatic stress disorder (PTSD).

There are various predisposing psycho-biological and environmental factors that determine whether one's earlier emotional trauma might lead to the development of a true clinical picture of posttraumatic stress disorder. This would lower their threshold for becoming aroused and make them more likely to become anxious when they encounter stresses in life that are reminiscent of childhood separations and fears, hence more prone to becoming post-traumatic.

Another factor is that insecure attachments in childhood have shown to predispose the individuals to difficulties in forming secure attachments in adulthood and to having heightened responses to rejection and loss.

There is also variation in individuals' neurochemical systems that govern the stress regulation. Depending on the severity of the stress response induced in an individual by an event (i.e. a romantic breakup), certain concentrations of stress hormones including CRF, ACTH, and cortisol work to intensify the imprinting of an emotional memory of the event, indelibly inscribing its fears and other sensations in the amygdala (to serve as a warning for future events), while the same stress hormones can act to impede.

== Medical complications ==
=== Broken heart syndrome ===
In many legends and fictional tales, characters die after suffering a devastating loss; however, even in reality people die from what appears to be a broken heart. Takotsubo cardiomyopathy, or broken heart syndrome, is commonly described as a physical pain in the chest or heart or stomach area, which is due to the emotional stress caused by a traumatic breakup or the death of a loved one.

Broken heart syndrome mimics symptoms of a heart attack, but it is clinically different from a heart attack because the patients have few risk factors for heart disease and were previously healthy prior to the heart muscles weakening. Some echocardiograms expressed how the left ventricle, of people with the broken heart syndrome, was contracting normally but the middle and upper sides of the heart muscle had weaker contractions due to inverted T waves and longer Q-T intervals that are associated with stress. Magnetic resonance images suggested that the recovery rates for those with broken heart syndrome are faster than those who had heart attacks and complete recovery to the heart is achieved within two months.

=== Endocrine and immune dysfunction ===
Physiological and biochemical changes that contribute to higher physical illnesses and heart disease have been found in individuals that have high levels of anxiety and depression. Some individuals who have divorced have compromised immune systems because of inflammatory cytokines followed by a state of depression.

== Cultural references ==
The sentiment is expressed in a collection of Sumerian proverbs:

May Inana pour oil on my heart that aches.

Biblical references to the pain of a broken heart date back to 1015 BC:

Insults have broken my heart and left me weak, I looked for sympathy but there was none; I found no one to comfort me

— Psalm 69:20

Rudaki, regarded as the first great genius of Persian poetry, used broken heart imagery in his writing:

Look at the cloud, how it cries like a grieving man
Thunder moans like a lover with a broken heart.

Shakespeare's play Antony and Cleopatra features a character, Enobarbus, who dies of a broken heart after betraying a friend. Lady Montague dies of a broken heart after the banishment of her son in Romeo and Juliet.

Frida Kahlo's 1937 painting Memory, the Heart portrays the artist's heartbreak during and after an affair between her husband and her sister.

== See also ==
- Emptiness
- Interpersonal relationship
- Intimate relationship
- Limerence
- Love addiction
- Lovesickness
- Loneliness
- Unrequited love
- Widowhood effect

== Sources ==
=== Printed ===
- Carll, Elizabeth (2007). Trauma Psychology: Violence And Disaster. Greenwood Publishing Group. ISBN 978-0275985318.
- Eisenberger, Naomi; Lieberman, Matthew (2004). "Why Rejection Hurts: A Common Neural Alarm System For Physical And Social Pain". Trends in Cognitive Sciences. 8 (7). University of California: 294–300. doi:10.1016/j.tics.2004.05.010. PMID 15242688. S2CID 15893740.
- Field, Tiffany (2 December 2012). "Attachment as psychobiological attunement: Being on the same wavelength". In Reite, Martin (ed.). The Psychobiology of Attachment and Separation. Elsevier. ISBN 978-0-323-14721-7.
- Lumb, Philip (2014). Critical Care Ultrasound: Expert Consult. Elsevier Health Sciences. ISBN 978-0323278171.

=== Online ===
- "A Broken Heart can Really Hurt You". BPDFamily.com.
- "Diseases And Conditions: Broken Heart Syndrome". Mayo Clinic.
- "Grief, Depressive Symptoms, And Physical Health Among Recently Bereaved Spouses". The Gerontologist. Archived from the original on 13 May 2015.
- "Why Does Social Exclusion Hurt? The Relationship Between Social And Physical Pain" (PDF). Psychological Bulletin. Archived from the original (PDF) on 8 April 2020.
- "What Causes Chest Pain When Feelings Are Hurt?". Scientific American.
- "Study Illuminates The 'Pain' Of Social Rejection". University of Michigan News Service. 25 March 2011.
- Kross E, Berman MG, Mischel W, Smith EE, Wager TD (April 2011). "Social Rejection Shares Somatosensory Representations With Physical Pain". Proceedings of the National Academy of Sciences. 108 (15). National Academy of Sciences: 6270–6275. Bibcode:2011PNAS..108.6270K. doi:10.1073/pnas.1102693108. PMC 3076808. PMID 21444827.
