= Shelley E. Taylor =

American psychologist

- Born: 1946 (age 79–80)
- Education: Connecticut College (BA); Yale University (PhD)
- Occupations: Professor; author
- Known for: cognitive miser, social cognition, social neuroscience, health psychology
- Awards: APA Award for Lifetime Contributions to Psychology (2010)

Shelley Elizabeth Taylor (born 1946) is an American psychologist. She serves as a distinguished professor of psychology at the University of California, Los Angeles. She received her Ph.D. from Yale University, and was formerly on the faculty at Harvard University. A prolific author of books and scholarly journal articles, Taylor has long been a leading figure in two subfields related to her primary discipline of social psychology: social cognition and health psychology. Her books include The Tending Instinct and Social Cognition, the latter by Susan Fiske and Shelley Taylor.

Taylor's professional honours include the Distinguished Scientific Contribution Award from the American Psychological Association (APA; 1996), the William James Fellow Award from the Association for Psychological Science (APS; 2001), and the APA's Lifetime Achievement Award, which she received in August 2010. Taylor was inducted into the United States National Academy of Sciences in 2009. She was elected to the American Philosophical Society in 2018. For 2019 she received the BBVA Foundation Frontiers of Knowledge Award in Social Sciences.

== Early life and education ==
Taylor was born in 1946 in the small village of Mt. Kisco, New York. She was the only child of her father, a history teacher, and her mother, a former pop and jazz pianist turned piano teacher. Before her father became a history teacher, he was a psychiatric nurse. During World War II, he was ineligible for service because of Polio, so he volunteered with the Society of Friends and built the first mental hospital in Eritrea. She grew up in Chappaqua, New York, about one hour north of New York City near the Connecticut border. Taylor attended Horace Greeley High School in Chappaqua. After one of Taylor's high school history teachers received a grant to study psychology, she began teaching psychology to her students instead of history — a life-changing experience for Taylor.

=== Connecticut College ===
Taylor began classes at Connecticut College in 1964. Influenced by her father's stories, she signed up for an introductory psychology class, which concluded with an offer from the professor to major in the subject. Taylor expected to become a clinician, but after spending a summer with Volunteers in Service to America working with schizophrenic men, she decided research would be more satisfying. Her first experiment examined women's evaluations of other women who had chosen to go into careers instead of having traditional family roles. With Sara Kiesler as her advisor, Taylor was interested in attending graduate school at either the University of Rochester to work with Elaine Walster or Yale to work with David Mettee. She eventually decided on Yale.

=== Graduate School at Yale ===
At Yale, she briefly worked with Mettee, but their interests and personal styles did not match. She wanted to work with Richard Nisbett, but his laboratory was full. She eventually did her dissertation research on attribution theory with John McConahay. Her dissertation focused on Daryl Bem's self-perception theory and addressed whether or not people infer their attitudes from their behavior. She found that false feedback of one's behavior is accepted as a basis for one's attitudes if it is consistent with pre-existing attitudes.

While at Yale, she encountered several other people who would be leaders in psychology in the future, such as Mark Zanna, Michael Storms, Ellen Langer, Carol Dweck, James Cutting, Henry Roediger, and Robert Kraut. A very significant person in Taylor's academic career was Kenneth Keniston, a psychiatrist at the Yale School of Medicine. He typically did not work with psychology graduate students. Still, after some persuasion, he taught Taylor and some other students about using interviews to generate and test hypotheses.

Taylor was also influenced by the women's movement of the 1960s. She joined the New Haven Women's Liberation Movement and helped organize demonstrations, sit-ins, protests, and conferences. She was arrested once for storming Mory's, a Yale club that was originally only open to men. Within months, the policy was changed, and women were allowed. She received her doctorate in social psychology from Yale in 1972. While at Yale, Taylor also met her future husband, architect Mervyn Fernandes. After Yale, she received a position at Harvard.

== Harvard ==
After Yale, Taylor and her husband moved to Cambridge and she worked in Harvard's Psychology and Social Relations Department. She became very interested in social cognition and drew heavily on attribution theory. Taylor was among the first to apply the breakthrough work of Daniel Kahneman and Amos Tversky on heuristics and biases to the field of social psychology (Taylor, 1982).

=== Social cognition ===
With an undergraduate named Susan Fiske at Harvard, Taylor began a research program on salience and the effects that salience has on people's inferences. In a famous paper, Taylor and Fiske found that "point of view influences perceptions of causality, such that a person who engulfs your visual field is seen as more impactful in a situation...imagining actions from the perspective of a particular character leads to empathetic inference and recall of information best learned from that person's perspectives." Taylor also did other work on salience about stereotyping and cognitive biases. For example, she found that if a person in your field is a token or solitary member of a group, they are more likely to be viewed in stereotyped role than if the person was a member of the majority group and their identity is much more salient. For example, when people observed a group of men and women having a discussion, the viewers organized their recall around gender, such that when people were likely to attribute a comment from one person to another incorrectly, it was usually mixing up a woman's comment with another woman or mixing up a man's comment with another man (Taylor, 1981).

Taylor has also contributed to social cognition with her "top of the head phenomena" (Taylor & Fiske, 1978). The top of the head phenomena states, "the more salient an actor is, the more an observer will ascribe a causality to him or her rather than to other less salient actors." For example, in a situation with a clear leader, other actors are focused on the leader and the leader is seen as the cause of an event instead of external events or other actors, even when it is not true. It is hypothesized that people focus mostly on the salience of a person to make snap judgments instead of truly understanding a given situation (Goethals et al., 2004: pg. 59).

In 1984, Taylor co-authored a book entitled Social Cognition with her former student Susan Fiske. This book became instrumental in defining the scope and ambition of the nascent social cognition field. A second edition was published in 1991, and a sequel entitled Social Cognition: From Brains to Culture appeared in 2007. Taylor has also researched social comparison processes and continues to conduct and publish research on social cognition throughout the 1990s and 2000s.

=== Health psychology ===
Around 1976, Taylor was contacted by Judy Rodin to present a social psychological perspective on breast cancer. At the time, however, no research was looking at the links between social psychology and health. So Taylor and a friend with breast cancer at the time, Smadar Levin, decided to explore the connection between social psychology and what is now known as health psychology. Taylor along with other social psychologists such as Howard Friedman and Christine Dunkel-Schetter were instrumental in the development of health psychology as a specialty. At Harvard, however, it was difficult to pursue health psychology because the medical school was so far from the main campus. Taylor asked the university president at the time, Derek Bok, for some start-up funds to help develop a health psychology program at Harvard. He provided her with a $10,000 check to develop a health psychology interest at Harvard. However, she was passed up for tenure at Harvard and went to the University of California, Los Angeles.

== UCLA ==
In 1979, she joined the faculty at UCLA, where they were very interested in growing health psychology. In 1981, Taylor applied for and received the National Institutes of Health Research Scientist Development Award to receive additional training in disease processes. It was a 10-year award that allowed her to learn biological assessments and methods. With biological psychologist John Libeskind, Taylor was able to look at stress and its effects on stress regulatory systems.

At this time, she became very interested in understanding the coping processes of women with breast cancer so she began interviewing them and their partners about their experiences. Through intensive interviews, Taylor found that some of the women's beliefs were to a degree, illusions. Many women held unrealistic beliefs about their recovery from cancer and their abilities to rid themselves of the cancer. Her research on these women led to the development of Taylor's theory of cognitive adaptation (Taylor, 1983). Cognitive adaptation states that when someone faces a threatening event, their readjustment centers around finding meaning in their experience, gaining control over the situation, and boosting one's self-esteem. This work clearly informed one of her next big topics, positive illusions.

=== Positive illusions ===
In 1988, Taylor and a colleague Jonathon Brown published "Illusion and Well-Being: A Social Psychological Perspective on Mental Health", one of the most cited social psychology papers ever (Taylor & Brown, 1988). Taylor's research on positive illusions is some of her most influential and well-known work. Taylor has described positive illusions as follows: "Rather than perceiving themselves, the world, and the future accurately, most people regard themselves, their circumstances, and the future as considerably more positive than is objectively likely.... These illusions are not merely characteristic of human thought; they appear to be adaptive, promoting rather than undermining good mental health."

Taylor's positive illusion work did elicit a lot of criticism from other social psychologists. For example, Shedler, Mayman, and Manis (1993) reported evidence that positive illusions may not be adaptive. People with overly positive views were maladjusted in clinical interviews. Also, people with this "illusory mental health" have stronger biological responses to stressful tasks. This contradicted Taylor's findings that showed that cancer patients with more positive illusions had lower mortality rates than those without positive illusions. Taylor then did other studies that showed that people with AIDS who hold positive illusions about their ability to overcome the disease lived longer and were less likely to develop AIDS symptoms over time.

Her research on positive illusions was also influential in her personal life. She says "interviewing those women about the insights that came from their disease, so many said that it makes you realize that relationships are the most important thing you have and that children were the most important thing they did with their lives...I went home and talked with my husband, and we thought about having a child." They later had two children, one daughter and one son.

=== Social neuroscience ===
In the mid-1990s, Taylor participated in the MacArthur Network on Socioeconomic Status and Health and developed an interest in mechanisms linking psychosocial conditions to health outcomes. In another very popular paper with some UCLA colleagues, Rena Repetti and Teresa Seeman, titled "Health psychology: What is an unhealthy environment and how does it get under the skin?," they explored processes by which environments with different stressors such as poverty, violence exposure, threat, and other chronically stressful events lead to differences in health outcomes by socioeconomic status. Taylor greatly drew on Bruce McEwen's concept of allostatic load, the cumulative wear and tear on the body. In subsequent work with Repetti and Seeman, Taylor found that risky family environments predict elevated blood pressure and heart rate and an elevated flat cortisol slope in stressful laboratory tasks. Taylor also has interest in social support and how it relates to biology. She has examined cultural and gender differences in social support and how they affect adjustment to stressful life events. She has also found that people with more psychosocial resources have lesser cardiovascular and hypothalamic-pituitary-adrenal responses to stress. Her interest in social support also influenced her tend-and-befriend model which will be discussed below.

Taylor has become a leading figure in the newly emerging field of social neuroscience. This work has included research using functional magnetic resonance imaging (fMRI), conducted in collaboration with UCLA colleagues Matthew Lieberman and Naomi Eisenberger. In one study, they found that kids from risky families and environments have deficits in emotion regulation in response to stressful circumstance that can be seen at the neural level (Taylor, Eisenberger, Saxbe, Lehman, & Lieberman, 2006). In another, they found that high levels of social support are crucial to attenuating neuroendocrine responses to stress through less activation of particular brain areas such as the dACC and Brodmann's area 8 (Eisenberger, Taylor, Gable, Hillmert, & Lieberman, 2007). They have done more research on the serotonin transporter polymorphism (Taylor, Way et al., 2006) and on plasma oxytocin and vasopressin (Taylor, Gonzaga et al., 2006; Taylor, Saphire-Bernstein & Seeman, 2010).

=== Tend and befriend model ===
In 2000, Taylor and colleagues developed the tend and befriend model of responses to stress. This model contrasts with the "fight-or-flight response" which states that in the face of a harmful stressor, we either face it or run from it. Instead, tend and befriend evolves from an evolutionary perspective and asserts that "people, especially women, evolved social means for dealing with stress that involved caring for offspring and protecting them from harm and turning to the social group for protection for the self and offspring." Taylor hypothesized that fight or flight would not be as evolutionarily adaptive for women as for men because women typically have young children. Regan Gurung, a colleague of Taylor's and a developer of the theory, once stated:

"The 'fight or flight' model is based on the very simple assumption that our bodies prepare us for action to either fight with a foe or to run away from it. However, from an evolutionary standpoint, women evolved as caregivers; applying the same 'fight or flight' model, if women fight and lose, they leave an infant behind. By the same token, if they flee, it's a lot harder to flee if you are carrying an infant, and you won't leave the infant behind."

So, females may form tight social bonds to seek out friends in times of stress. Research by Taylor and Repetti has found that during times of stress, women typically spend more time tending to vulnerable offspring while men were more likely to withdraw from family life. Oxytocin, a female reproductive hormone typically involved in pair bonding and endorphins, proteins that alleviate pain, are hypothesized to be the biological mechanisms by which we tend and befriend. From this area of research, Taylor wrote "The Tending Instinct: Women, Men, and the Biology of Relationships".

== Publications ==
Note: List is selective and includes only highly cited and important works and works cited above.

=== Books ===
- Fiske, Susan T.; Taylor, Shelley E. (2008). Social cognition: from brains to culture. Boston: McGraw-Hill Higher Education. ISBN 978-0-07-340552-0.
- Fiske, Susan T.; Schacter, Daniel L.; Taylor, Shelley E. (2011). Annual Review of Psychology. Vol. 62. Palo Alto, Calif: Annual Reviews. ISBN 978-0-8243-0262-7.
- Fiske, Susan T.; Schacter, Daniel L.; Taylor, Shelley E. (2012). Annual Review of Psychology. Vol. 63. Palo Alto, Calif: Annual Reviews. ISBN 978-0-8243-0263-4.

=== Chapters in books ===
- Taylor, S. E. (1981). A categorization approach to stereotyping. In D. L. Hamilton (Ed.) Cognitive processes in stereotyping and intergroup behavior (pp. 83–114). Hillsdale, NJ: Lawrence Erlbaum Associates, Inc.
- Taylor, S. E. (1982). The availability bias in social perception and interaction. In D. Kahneman, P. Slovic & A. Tversky (Eds.) Judgment under uncertainty: Heuristics and biases (pp. 190–200). New York: Cambridge University Press.
- Taylor, S. E. (2008). From social psychology to neuroscience and back. In R. Levine, A. Rodrigues & L. Zelezny (Eds.) Journeys in Social Psychology: Looking Back to Inspire the Future (pp. 39–54). New York: Psychology Press.
- Goethals, G. R., Sorenson, G. J., & Burns, J. M. (Eds.). (2004). Encyclopedia of leadership: AE (Vol. 1). Sage.

=== Journal articles ===
- Taylor, S. E.; Fiske, Susan (1978). "Salience, attention, and attribution: Top of the head phenomena". Advances in Experimental Social Psychology. 11: 249–288. doi:10.1016/s0065-2601(08)60009-x. ISBN 978-0-12-015211-7.
- Eisenberger, N. I.; Taylor, S. E.; Gable, S. L.; Hilmert, C. J.; Lieberman, M. D. (2007). "Neural pathways link social support to attenuated neuroendocrine stress responses". NeuroImage. 35 (4): 1601–1612. doi:10.1016/j.neuroimage.2007.01.038. PMC 2710966. PMID 17395493.
- Taylor, S. E. (1983). "Adjustment to threatening events: A theory of cognitive adaptation". American Psychologist. 38 (11): 1161–1173. doi:10.1037/0003-066X.38.11.1161.
- Taylor, S. E., & Brown, J. D (1988). "Illusion and well-being: A social psychological perspective on mental health" (PDF). Psychological Bulletin. 103 (2): 193–210. doi:10.1037/0033-2909.103.2.193. PMID 3283814. S2CID 762759.
- Taylor, S. E.; Burklund, L. J.; Eisenberger, N. I.; Lehman, B. J.; Hilmert, C. J.; Lieberman, M. D. (2008). "Neural bases of moderation of cortisol stress responses by psychosocial resources". Journal of Personality and Social Psychology. 95 (1): 197–211. doi:10.1037/0022-3514.95.1.197. PMID 18605860.
- Taylor, S. E.; Eisenberger, N. I.; Saxbe, D.; Lehman, B. J.; Lieberman, M. D. (2006). "Neural responses to emotional stimuli are associated with childhood family stress". Biological Psychiatry. 60 (3): 296–301. doi:10.1016/j.biopsych.2005.09.027. PMID 16460697. S2CID 14988867.
- Taylor, S. E.; Gonzaga, G. C.; Klein, L. C.; Hu, P.; Greendale, G. A.; Seeman, T. E. (2006). "Relation of oxytocin to psychological stress responses and hypothalamic-pituitary-adrenocortical axis activity in older women". Psychosomatic Medicine. 68 (2): 238–245. doi:10.1097/01.psy.0000203242.95990.74. PMID 16554389. S2CID 6697304.
- Taylor, S. E.; Klein, L. C.; Lewis, B. P.; Gruenewald, T. L.; Gurung, R. A. R.; Updegraff, J. A. (2000). "Biobehavioral responses to stress in females: Tend-and-befriend, not fight-or-flight". Psychological Review. 107 (3): 411–429. doi:10.1037/0033-295X.107.3.411. PMID 10941275.
- Taylor, S. E.; Saphire-Bernstein, S.; Seeman, T. E. (2010). "Are plasma oxytocin in women and plasma vasopressin in men biomarkers of distressed pair-bond relationships?". Psychological Science. 21 (1): 3–7. doi:10.1177/0956797609356507. PMID 20424014. S2CID 6006729.
- Taylor, S. E.; Way, B. M.; Welch, W. T.; Hilmert, C. J.; Lehman, B. J.; Eisenberger, N. I. (2006). "Early family environment, current adversity, the serotonin transporter polymorphism, and depressive symptomatology". Biological Psychiatry. 60 (7): 671–676. doi:10.1016/j.biopsych.2006.04.019. PMID 16934775. S2CID 14433360.
