= John T. Cacioppo =

American academic

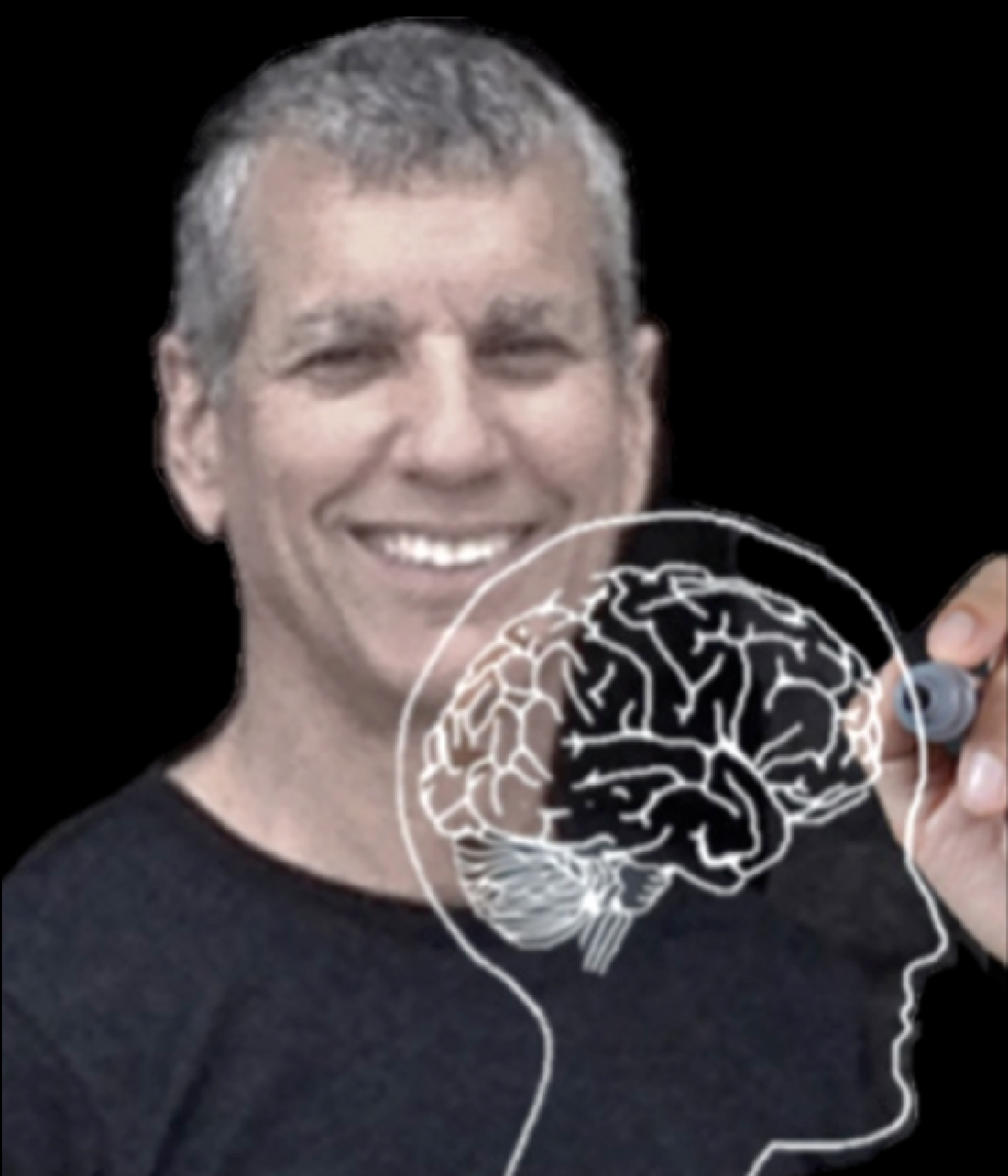
- Born: June 12, 1951; Marshall, Texas, US
- Died: March 5, 2018 (aged 66); Chicago, Illinois, US
- Education: Ohio State University, Ohio, US
- Known for: Co-founder of social neuroscience
- Spouse: Stephanie Cacioppo (m. 2011)
- Children: 2 Christina Cacioppo Anthony Cacioppo
- Scientific career
- Fields: Social neuroscience, social psychology, cognitive neuroscience, biological psychology
- Workplaces: University of Chicago (professor)
- Thesis: Heart Rate, Cognitive Response, and Persuasion (1977)
- Doctoral advisor: Anthony Greenwald

John Terrence Cacioppo (June 12, 1951 – March 5, 2018) was the Tiffany and Margaret Blake Distinguished Service Professor at the University of Chicago. He founded the University of Chicago Center for Cognitive and Social Neuroscience and was the director of the Arete Initiative of the Office of the Vice President for Research and National Laboratories at the University of Chicago. He co-founded the field of social neuroscience and was member of the department of psychology, department of psychiatry and behavioral neuroscience, and the college until his death in March 2018.

== Early life ==
Cacioppo was born and raised in Marshall, Texas, where his family owned a chain saw distribution company. In 1973, he earned a Bachelor of Science in economics from the University of Missouri, where he was the first in his family to go to college. Soon after, Cacioppo decided to specialize in psychology and received a master's degree (1975) and doctorate (1977) in this field from the Ohio State University.

A near-fatal car crash in his youth energised Cacioppo, who realised that the most important things in his life were love and social connections.

== Career ==
In the late 1970s, Cacioppo collaborated with Richard E. Petty to develop the elaboration likelihood model (ELM) of attitudes and persuasion and began investigations of individual differences in cognitive motivation. They also examined the social and biological influences on mind and behavior. Petty and Cacioppo enjoyed a friendly intellectual rivalry and became best friends and eventually roommates so that, in Cacioppo's words, they "didn't have to take breaks" between scientific debates. The elaboration likelihood model emerged in part because Petty speculated that listening to strong arguments like Cacioppo's were more likely to result in durable attitude change. A decade later, Cacioppo began working with Gary Berntson to pioneer a new field they called social neuroscience. This led to an expansion of Cacioppo's research examining how personal relationships get under the skin to affect social cognition and emotions, personality processes, biology, and health. By employing brain scans, monitoring of autonomic and neuroendocrine processes, and assays of immune function, he found the overpowering influence of social context — a factor so strong that it can alter genetic expression in white blood cells. The work further showed how the subjective sense of social isolation (loneliness) uniquely disrupts our perceptions, behavior, and physiology, becoming a trap that not only reinforces isolation, but can also lead to early death. In 2004, he and William Patrick began a collaboration that led to their book, Loneliness: Human Nature and the Need for Social Connection, which makes the case that social cooperation is, in fact, humanity's defining characteristic. Gary Berntson, Jean Decety, Stephanie Cacioppo, Steve Cole, Dorret Boomsma, and Abraham Palmer continue to investigate the biological mechanisms involved in social perception, interpersonal processes, cognition, emotion, and behavior.

== Board roles ==
Cacioppo served as the president of the Association for Psychological Science, the Society for Personality and Social Psychology, the Society for Consumer Psychology, the Society for Psychophysiological Research, and the Society for Social Neuroscience. He also served as the chair of the Psychology Section of the American Association for the Advancement of Science; chair of the National Research Council's Board of Behavior, Cognitive, and Sensory Sciences (BBCSS); and chair of the international board of the Cluster of Excellence "Languages and Emotion," Free University Berlin. He was elected as a fellow in various societies, including the American Academy of Arts and Sciences; the Society of Experimental Psychologists; the Society of Experimental Social Psychology; and The Royal Society of Arts. He was also elected as a distinguished member of various societies, including Psi Chi; the American Association for the Advancement of Science; the American Psychological Association; the Association for Psychological Science; the Society for Social Neuroscience; the American Academy of Behavioral Medicine Research; the World Innovation Foundation; the International Organization of Psychophysiology; the Society for Personality and Social Psychology; and the Society of Behavioral Medicine.

Cacioppo served on various boards, including the President's Committee for the National Medal of Science; the International Scientific Advisory Committee for the Institute of Cognitive Neurology (INECO); the Advisory Committee for the Social, Behavioral, and Economic Sciences (SBE) Directorate of the National Science Foundation; the scientific advisory committee of the College of Brain and Cognitive Sciences, Beijing Normal University; the National Institutes of Health Center for Scientific Review (CSR) Advisory Council; the Expert Panel on Program to Reduce Social Isolation, Mary Foundation in Copenhagen, Denmark; the board of directors of the Society for Social Neuroscience; the board of directors of the Federation of Associations in Behavioral and Brain Sciences; the External Advisory Committee of the Beckman Institute for Advanced Science and Technology at the University of Illinois; the Health and Retirement Study Data Monitoring Board of the National Institute on Aging; the Department of Health and Human Services National Advisory Council on Aging; and also the board of directors of the scientific societies for which he served as president.

== Honors and awards ==
He received the Society for Experimental Social Psychology's Distinguished Scientist Award in recognition of “unusually important contributions to experimental social psychology” (2015); Troland Research Award from the National Academy of Sciences; the Distinguished Scientific Award for an Early Career Contribution to Psychophysiology; an honorary Doctor of Science degree from Bard College; the Distinguished Scientific Contribution Award from the American Psychological Association; the Award for Distinguished Scientific Contributions to Psychophysiology from the Society for Psychophysiological Research; the Donald Campbell Award from the Society for Personality and Social Psychology; the Patricia Barchas Award from the American Psychosomatic Society; the Award for Distinguished Service on Behalf of Personality and Social Psychology from the Society of Personality and Social Psychology; the Theoretical Innovation Prize from the Society for Personality and Social Psychology; the Presidential Citation from the American Psychological Association; the Order of the Sons of Italy Award; the Distinguished Alumnus Award from Ohio State University Department of Psychology; and the Scientific Impact Award from the Society for Experimental Social Psychology. He was the keynote speaker at various meetings including the Festival della Scienza in Genoa, Italy; the Annual Meeting of the Association for Psychological Science; and the Society for Social Neuroscience

Quantitative analyses of the field have shown Cacioppo to be one of “ISI Highly Cited Researchers” in Psychiatry/Psychology (since 2003) and one of the top 50 most eminent psychologists of the Modern Era (post WWII; Diener, E., Oishi, S., & Park, J. Y. (2014). An incomplete list of eminent psychologists of the modern era, Archives of Psychological Science, 2, 20–32). In May 2018, Google Scholar Analytics showed his work had been cited over 128,680 times and his h-index was 151.

== Tributes ==
=== 2018 ===
William James Fellow Award from the Association for Psychological Science.

Dedication of the Unlonely Film Festival Conference from The Foundation for Art and Healing.

Memorial at Rockefeller Chapel, University of Chicago.

=== 2019 ===
In Memoriam: John T. Cacioppo (1951 – 2018), by Philip Rubin. American Psychologist, 2019, Vol. 74, No. 6, 745.

== About social neuroscience ==
In the early 1990s, Cacioppo began working with Gary Berntson of the Ohio State University to pioneer a new field they called “social neuroscience.”

Social neuroscience is an interdisciplinary attempt to trace how social forces “get under the skin” to affect physiology, as well as how physiology influences social interactions. His collaborative research on loneliness raised questions about one of the pillars of modern medicine and psychology —the focus on the individual as the broadest appropriate unit of inquiry. The new discipline that examines the associations between social and neural levels of organizations and the biological mechanisms underlying these associations. Neuroscientists have tended to focus on single organisms, organs, cells, or intracellular processes. Social species create emergent organizations beyond the individual, however, and these emergent structures evolved hand in hand with neural and hormonal mechanisms to support them because the consequent social behaviors helped animals survive, reproduce, and care for offspring sufficiently long that they too reproduced. Social neuroscience, therefore, is concerned with how biological systems implement social processes and behavior, capitalizing on concepts and methods from the neuroscience to inform and refine theories of social psychological processes, and using social and behavioral concepts and data to inform and refine theories of neural organization and function

By employing brain scans, monitoring of autonomic and neuroendocrine processes, and assays of immune function, Cacioppo and colleagues found that social context alters genetic expression, for instance in white blood cells. This research also showed that “loneliness” – the subjective social isolation – disrupts perception and alters behavior and physiology, becoming a trap that reinforces isolation. . These biological pathways were argued to be unique and to lead to early death.

Cacioppo and Jean Decety played an instrumental role in the creation of the Society for Social Neuroscience in 2010.

== Personal life and death ==
Cacioppo had two children in his first marriage, with Barbara Andersen, a psychology professor, which ended in divorce. He met his third wife, Stephanie, a brain researcher at a scientific conference in Shanghai, and they married in 2011.

Cacioppo developed salivary-gland cancer in 2015.

He died at his home at the age of 66 on March 5, 2018, of natural causes.

== Bibliography ==
=== Co-author ===
- Attitudes and Persuasion: Classic and Contemporary Approaches, (1981): Westview Press.
- Communication and Persuasion: Central and Peripheral Routes to Attitude Change, (1986): Springer.
- Emotional Contagion - Studies in Emotion and Social Interaction, (1993): Cambridge University Press.
- Social Neuroscience: Key Readings in Social Psychology, (2004): Psychology Press.
- Loneliness: Human Nature and the Need for Social Connection, (2008): W.W. Norton & Co.
- Chicago Social Brain Network (2011). Invisible forces and powerful beliefs: Gravity, gods, and minds, 2011: Upper Saddle River, NJ: FT Press.
- Discovering psychology: The science of the mind (first edition), (2013): Boston: Cengage.
- Discovering psychology: The science of the mind, Briefer edition (first edition) 2013: Boston: Cengage.
- Discovering psychology: The science of the mind (2nd edition), (2016): Boston: Cengage.
- Psychotherapy Dictionary (2 Volumes) (Co-written with Reza Shapurian and Hamideh Jahangiri ), volume one volume two
- Psychotherapy with Depressed Patients (2 Volumes) (Co-written with Reza Zamani and Hamideh Jahangiri ), volume one volume two

=== Editor ===
- Perspectives in cardiovascular psychophysiology (1982). New York:Guilford Press.
- Social psychophysiology: A sourcebook (1983). New York: Guilford Press.
- Principles of psychophysiology: Physical, social, and inferential elements (1990): New York: Cambridge University Press.
- Handbook of psychophysiology, 2nd edition (2000): New York: Cambridge University
- Foundations in social neuroscience (2002): Cambridge, MA: MIT Press.
- Essays in social neuroscience (2004): Cambridge, MA: MIT Press.
- Social neuroscience (2005): New York: Psychology Press.
- Social neuroscience: People thinking about thinking people (2006): Cambridge: MIT Press.
- Handbook of psychophysiology, 3rd edition (2007): New York: Cambridge University Press.
- Handbook of neuroscience for the behavioral sciences (2009):New York: John Wiley & Sons.
- The Oxford handbook of social neuroscience (2011): New York: Oxford University Press.

== Former editorial duties ==
- Psychophysiology (editor, associate editor, Methodology Editor)
- Perspectives on Psychological Science (Advisory Editor, associate editor, editorial board)
- Psychological Review (associate editor, editorial board)
- Social Neuroscience (associate editor, editorial board)
- Proceedings of the National Academy of Sciences of the United States of America (guest editor)
- American Psychologist (guest editor)
- Journal of Personality and Social Psychology: Personality Processes and Individual Differences (guest editor, editorial board)
- Journal of Consumer Research (Advisory Editor, editorial board)
- Current Opinion in Behavioral Sciences (Editorial Board)
- Journal of Personality and Social Psychology: Attitudes and Social Cognition (Editorial Board)
- Social, Cognitive, and Affective Neuroscience (Editorial Board)
- Basic and Applied Social Psychology (Editorial Board)
- BioMed Central (Editorial Board)
- Journal of Applied Social Psychology (Editorial Board)
- Journal of Neuroscience, Psychology, and Economics (Editorial Board)
- The Open Psychology Journal (Editorial Board)
- Behavioral and Cognitive Neuroscience Reviews (Editorial Board)
- Personality and Social Psychology Review (Editorial Board)
- Review of Personality and Social Psychology (Editorial Board)
- International Journal of Psychophysiology (Editorial Board)
- Personality and Social Psychology Bulletin (Editorial Board)

== See also ==
- Biological psychology
- Affective neuroscience
- Social psychology
- Social neuroscience
- Social cognition
- Elaboration likelihood model
