= Society for Social Neuroscience =

Professional Society

- Founded: 2010
- Founder: John Cacioppo, Jean Decety
- Purpose: Social Neuroscience
- Location: 5658 S. University Avenue, Chicago, IL 60637
- Members: 204
- Key people: Steve Phelps, President
- Website: www.s4sn.org

The Society for Social Neuroscience (S4SN) is an academic association headquartered at the University of Chicago that consists of neuroscientists, psychologists, social scientists, and physicians around the world whose research is focused on the study of the biological systems that implement social processes and behavior, or how the brain and nervous system implement social interaction. The society has chapters in China and South America.

== Mission ==
The mission of the society is to serve as an international, interdisciplinary, distributed gathering place to advance and foster scientific training, research, and applications in the field of social neuroscience for the sake of humankind.

== History ==
The Society for Social Neuroscience was founded on January 20, 2010, in Auckland, New Zealand, after a series of consultations led by John Cacioppo and Jean Decety with social psychologists, anthropologists, sociologists, economists, neuroscientists, psychiatrists, and neurologists from all over the world. Its inaugural meeting took place on November 12, 2010, the day prior to the 2010 Society for Neuroscience meeting in San Diego, California.

== See also ==
- Affective neuroscience
- Behavioral neuroscience
- Cognitive neuropsychology
- Cognitive neuroscience
- Emotion
- Neuroeconomics
- Neuroscience
- Psychology
- Psychiatry
- Social cognition
- Social Neuroscience (journal)
- Social psychology
