= Personality neuroscience =

Personality neuroscience uses neuroscientific methods to study the neurobiological mechanisms underlying individual differences in stable psychological attributes. Specifically, personality neuroscience aims to investigate the relationships between inter-individual variation in brain structures as well as functions and behavioral measures of persistent psychological traits, broadly defined as "predispositions and average tendencies to be in particular states", including but are not limited to personality traits, sociobehavioral tendencies, and psychopathological risk factors. Personality neuroscience is considered as an interdisciplinary field integrating research questions and methodologies from social psychology, personality psychology, and neuroscience. It is closely related to other interdisciplinary fields, such as social, cognitive, and affective neuroscience.

== History ==
Personality neuroscience is a field built upon the study of personality, which has been a central theme in psychology and evolving through various theoretical perspectives as well as methodological approaches over many years. Specifically, personality neuroscience aims to understand what neurobiological mechanisms underlie and contribute to personality, and therefore, is primarily based on theories that attribute individual differences to physiological and biological systems of the human body or brain. These theories can be traced back to many theories proposed by early physicians, philosophers, and psychologists. Ancient Greek physician Hippocrates developed the theories of Humorism by identifying four vital bodily "humors" or fluids (i.e., blood, phlegm, black bile, and yellow bile) to be associated with temperaments (i.e., sanguine, phlegmatic, melancholic, and choleric, respectively) as well as physical health outcomes. In the early 20th century, the psychoanalytic theories put forth by Austrian neurologist Sigmund Freud was anchored on the unconscious mental processes. Influenced by the psychoanalytic theories, American psychologist Henry A. Murray proposed five principles of personology, his term for the study and system of personality, in which the first principle states that "personality is rooted in the brain. The individual's cerebral physiology guides and govern every aspect of personality". Relatedly, Murray also suggested that "needs", which is the motivation that drive behaviors, arose as a result of "a physiochemical force in the brain". American psychologist William Sheldon was known for his work on defining three "somatotypes" (i.e., body types: endomorphs, mesomorphs, and ectomorphs) to personality attributes.

As early as the late 19th century, the case study of Phineas Gage, a railroad worker who survived a severe brain injury from an accident and underwent a significant personality change, was the first to suggest a causal link between the brain and personality. In the 1940s, there were studies investigating the association between brain wave patterns and individual differences using twin study paradigms, demonstrating that identical twins showed remarkably similar brain wave patterns measured by electroencephalography (EEG) when compared to fraternal twins. However, results from these studies were deemed hard to interpret "in the absence of any satisfactory theory linking brain-wave patterns to personality". Building off these studies and other studies that investigated the genetic inheritance of psychological attributes, in 1951, Hans J. Eysenck and D.B. Prell experimentally tested the heredity of neuroticism using a twin study paradigm and concluded that "the factor of neuroticism is not a statistical [artifact], but constitutes a biological unit which is inherited as a whole" and "the neurotic predisposition is to a large extent hereditarily determined". Following this work, Eysenck continued to investigate psychological traits in relation to neurobiological systems, including the nervous systems, arousal, and brain structures (e.g., reticular formation and the limbic system). In 1961, American psychologist Gordon W. Allport defined personality as "the dynamic organization within the individual of those psychophysical systems that determine his characteristic behavior and thought", localizing personality within "psychophysical systems".

=== Development ===
Extending from Eysenck's theory on the biological basis of personality, Jeffrey A. Gray's reinforcement sensitivity theory of personality and his work that studied the neural mechanisms underlying personality traits set the foundation for the contemporary field in personality neuroscience. For example, Gray's work suggested that introversion involved both the ascending reticular activating system and an inhibitory system of brain areas including the orbital frontal cortex, medial septal area, and. the hippocampus. In 1999, a chapter titled "The neuroscience of personality" written by Alan D. Pickering and Jeffrey A. Gray was published in the Handbook of personality: Theory and research, in which it introduced ways to "build a modern, integrated neuroscience of personality".

Although there had long been theoretically driven interests and experimental endeavors to understand the neurobiological basis of personality, it wasn't until recent years that, with the advancement in neuroscientific methodologies (e.g., non-invasive neuroimaging methods), the focus of personality psychology began to shift from observing, describing, and categorizing the phenomenon of individual differences towards discovering what may contribute to these observed individual differences. In 2010, the name "personality neuroscience" was coined by Colin G. DeYoung, who is a psychology professor and the director of the DeYoung Personality Lab at the University of Minnesota. In 2018, the Personality Neuroscience journal was established to "[publish] papers in the neuroscience of personality (including cognitive abilities, emotionality, and other individual differences) concerned with understanding causal bases" with "its focus on the equal importance of personality and neuroscience".

== Research methodologies ==
As personality neuroscience seeks to understand the link between personality and its underlying neurobiological mechanisms, generating testable hypotheses involve both the measurements of personality attributes and neurobiological structures and/or functions.

=== Measuring personality ===
In the field of personality psychology, there have been two main approaches to define personality traits:

1. Nomothetic approach defines personality traits in terms of dimensions and factors, or typologies comprising an organized group of trait-like characteristics, that are generalizable and universal to all people. Along with the development of the factor analysis and psychometrics, the nomothetic approach has been dominant in personality psychology as it offers quantitative measures of traits that can be easily incorporated in research designs and statistical analyses. Two popular models of personality traits are Eysenck's three-factor model (including three factors: neuroticism, extraversion, and psychoticism) and Goldberg's Big Five or McCrae and Costa's five-factor model (including five factors: extraversion, agreeableness, conscientiousness, neuroticism, and impulsivity/openness), in which the latter two are made up of slightly different dimensions but often conceptualized interchangeably in the literature. Just as the Eysenck model and Golderberg/McCrae and Costa's model disagree fundamentally on the numbers of factors (three versus five, respectively), there exists ongoing debates about the numbers of orthogonal factors that may be sufficient to define the personality space. In recent years, a hierarchal model of the Big Five personality is proposed, grouping the five factors (or "domains") into two higher-order "metatraits": stability (i.e., agreeableness, conscientiousness, and reverse-coded neuroticism) and plasticity (i.e., extraversion and openness/intellect) while dividing each domain into two aspects associated with different facets.
2. Idiographic approach emphasizes individuality and defines traits, including individualized traits and the pattern or organization of a combination of traits, in relation to a particular person. Allport, endorsing the idiographic approach, wrote that "the outstanding characteristic of man is his individuality", and his trait theory—centering on the cardinal, central, and secondary traits—were defined in idiographic terms. Personality research that adopted the idiographic approach have demonstrated that the nomothetic approach (e.g., the Big Five) may not be able to capture the within-person personality structure.

In personality neuroscience, personality is often defined using the nomothetic approach. Personality trait is typically measured using scales developed for the personality attributes of interests and administered through self-report surveys and questionnaires. One of the most commonly used ways to measure personality attributes in personality neuroscience research is the Big-Five personality traits. In addition to the criticism by proponents of the idiographic approach as mentioned above, self-report measures on personality traits in general are susceptible to response biases (e.g., social desirability bias, acquiescent response bias, etc.) and inaccurate introspection of mental states. Therefore, it is important to establish construct validity of the self-report measures of personality by using other scales of the same construct or other modalities of measures, such as behavioral data or aggregated ratings from other knowledgeable informants.

Another common nomothetic approach is the Affective Neuroscience Personality Scales (ANPS). The ANPS was originally published in 2003 and was used by neuroscientists to evaluate the primary emotional systems that underlie mental well-being and affective brain disorders. This scale was created by Jaak Panksepp so that researchers could use this self-report test to measure differences in the primary emotions, SEEKING, LUST, CARE, PLAY (the positive emotions) and FEAR, SADNESS, ANGER (the negative emotions). These differences in the emotions were then compared to the Big Five personality to look at the scale from an evolutionary perspective as the primary emotions were seen as a survival mechanism of inherited behavioral patterns by humans interacting with their environment. Each of these primary emotions have "been evolutionarily shaped in terms of inherited tools for survival and, more generally, for fitness" and are seen to regulate human nature. The SEEKING energy is used to seek valuable resources for survival, such as food, a mate, or shelter. The LUST energy is used to sustain the human species through reproductive means. The CARE system is significant in order to protect offspring so that they can grow into adults and the species is sustained once again. PLAY is important in order to foster social bonding between humans, to learn social and motor skills, and to regulate emotions. On the other hand with negative emotions, the FEAR energy is used for safety and to keep away from danger through means such as the flight or fight response. The SADNESS system, from an evolutionary perspective, is used to maintain socialness of an individual, as being isolated often evokes this emotion. The ANGER energy is important to protect resources from others or the environment.

However, since the late 2010s, researchers have begun to question the relevancy of ANPS and have identified areas of improvement. The primary emotional systems in psychopathologies often fluctuate. The assessment is also only found in one long version, and patients with depression who suffer from fatigue would benefit from a shorter version. Furthermore, the FEAR and SADNESS emotions exhibit high correlation because they are closely related, and it would be useful to find a method to disentangle them to better study them. Another concern is that the original ANPS does not assess individual differences in LUST.

=== Measuring brain structures and functions ===
To study the neurobiological mechanisms, or the structures and functions of the brain, underlying personality, personality neuroscience research employs established methods from neuroscience research. Some of the available neuroscientific methods are listed below with brief descriptions and how they can be incorporated in personality neuroscience research.

Magnetic resonance imaging (MRI) is a non-invasive imaging technique that uses the physical properties of magnetic fields and injection of radio-frequency pulses to examine the brain structure and functions with high spatial resolution. Both sMRI and fMRI have been used widely in both clinical and research settings to establish associations between the brain and a wide range of human socio-cognitive and psychological processes, as well as individual differences. Structural MRI (sMRI) of the brain provides the information on the neuroanatomical properties of the brain, such as the volumes of the gray and white matter. Functional MRI (fMRI) of the brain maps the functional organization of the brain by monitoring the localized brain activation through the change in blood oxygenation level as a result of the cerebral blood flow (CBF), either when participants are engaging in tasks (i.e., task-based fMRI) or at rest (i.e., resting-state fMRI). In addition to examine brain structure and function within localized brain regions, topological network analyses, such as graph theory in network neuroscience, can be conducted across brain regions to map out structural and functional connectivity patterns that vary with inter-individual variation in cognition and behaviors. In recent years, large MRI datasets, such as the Human Connectome Project (HCP), were collected with the aim to investigate the individual differences in structural and functional connectivity of the brain networks underlying a wide range of cognitive processes elicited by fMRI tasks.

Positron emission tomography (PET) is an imaging technique that uses radiotracers to spatially localize and track the distribution of changes in metabolic processes. Specifically, PET neuroimaging scans have been widely used in pre-clinical and clinical settings in relation to epilepsy, dementia, Parkinson's disease, and traumatic brain injuries.

Electroencephalography (EEG) is a tool that directly measures and records the electrical activity generated in the brain with high temporal resolution but relatively low spatial resolution. The EEG signal can be obtained non-invasively by placing electrodes on the scalp to capture the electrical impulses produced by neurons in the brain. It is commonly used in clinical settings to assess and detect neurological abnormalities in brain functions, such as epilepsy, sleep disorder, and brain injuries; in research, it has been used in couple with tasks to probe brain activities underlying various cognitive and emotional processes.

Molecular genetics is a sub-field in biology that investigates the structure, expression, and functions of genes, informing brain development and functions at the level of the genome. In the context of personality neuroscience, methods in molecular genetics have been used to establish genetic underpinnings of personality traits.

Assay measures biological processes by detecting signals produced by reagents. It can be used to quantify "endogenous psychoactive substances or their byproducts" (e.g., levels of dopamine, oxytocin, serotonin, etc.) that have been associated with psychological processes which may contribute to personality trait development or psychopathology.

Neuropharmocological manipulation involves the use of medication to induce changes in neurochemical processes and has been primarily studied for neurological or psychiatric drug treatments. Personality neuroscience can incorporate neuropsychopharmocological manipulation to establish causal link between personality traits and specific neurochemical processes (e.g., induced manipulation on levels of dopamine).

== Current research ==
In the past two decades, research in the field of personality neuroscience, utilizing neuroscientific methods outlined in the previous section, has identified neural mechanisms underlying a wide range of trait variables. This section reviews some of the major research findings in the field.

=== Big-five personality traits ===
- Neuroticism indicates the general proclivity to experience negative emotions and it is a risk factor as well as strong predictor for a wide range of psychopathology. People high in neuroticism may be extremely vulnerable to negative events and exhibit high levels of emotional instability, anxiety, moodiness, irritability, sadness, and so on. A line of neuroimaging studies have established association between neuroticism and brain activity in the amygdala, insula, anterior cingulate, and medial prefrontal cortex. Through methods that probe the molecular or neurochemical mechanisms, neuroticism has been linked differentially to baseline or stressor-related levels of the stress hormone cortisol, lower levels of serotonergic function, and higher levels of norepinephrine. EEG studies have demonstrated that withdraw-related neuroticism is correlated with greater activation in the right frontal lobe in comparison to the left, whereas the aspect of anger-proneness in neuroticism is related to greater activation in the left frontal lobe in comparison to the right.
- Extraversion captures the extent to which individuals are outgoing, assertive, sociable, gregarious, and enthusiastic. Extraverts thrive on social interactions with others and are inclined to engage in large social gatherings, whereas introverts may prefer to socialize in smaller groups or alone and engage in more solitary activities. A series of sMRI and fMRI studies have associated extraversion with the structure and function of brain regions that have been implicated in reward processing, including the medial orbitofrontal cortex, nucleus accumbens, amygdala, and striatum. EEG studies on extraversion showed converging results that extraversion was correlated with an event-related waveform reflecting "dopaminergic signaling of reward". Consistent with the evidence from MRI and EEG studies, neuropharmocological manipulation methods have shown that extraversion was moderated by dopaminergic drugs and that dopamine influences the pattern of cortical arousal in relation to extraversion.
- Openness to experience reflects an individual's inclination toward novelty, creativity, and intellectual curiosity. High scorers on openness to experience tend to be imaginative and open-minded, while low scorers on this trait may prefer a lifestyle of routine and familiarity. Recent work using the resting-state fMRI data from the Human Connectome Project has demonstrated that the individual functional connectivity matrices predicted openness to experience with accuracy almost on par with predictions for scores on intelligence tests, but not other four personality trait variables under the five-factor personality framework. In an fMRI study of older adults who underwent a visual memory encoding task in the scanner, a more similar functional memory brain-network activation patterns in older adults when compared to patterns in young adults, indicating a better preservation of the memory network, mediated the relationship between high openness scores and better memory performance. This result may suggest that openness to experience may serve as a protective factor against aging and memory deterioration.
- Agreeableness is related to interpersonal and socio-behavioral tendencies, such as compassion, cooperation, and kindness. People who are high in agreeableness are more empathetic and cooperative in general, while low scorers may be more competitive, antisocial, or exploitative. Not often a trait of interest in the literature of personality neuroscience as the construct is "social" in its nature, agreeableness has been linked to neural activity in left dorsolateral prefrontal cortex implicated in emotion regulation. In addition, one sMRI study has illustrated the correlation between agreeableness and volumes of brain areas that have been linked to social information processing (i.e., superior temporal sulcus, posterior cingulate cortex, and fusiform gyrus).
- Conscientiousness encompasses traits related to self-discipline, organization, and dependability. Individuals high in conscientiousness are often goal-oriented, diligent, organized, and reliable, while those low in this trait may be more spontaneous and flexible. One sMRI study have discovered the association between conscientiousness and the volume of the middle frontal gyrus in lateral prefrontal cortex. In addition to the association with volume in the middle frontal gyrus, another sMRI study also found the correlation between conscientiousness and the volume of bilateral superior parietal lobe, and that trait conscientiousness mediated the relationship between these brain regions and academic performance. Additionally, one fMRI study, which examined the functional connectivity within and across brain regions, identified a goal priority brain network (GPN) and its 5 sub-components. Functional connectivity within one GPN component (including regions of anterior insula, dorsal anterior cingulate cortex, and dorsolateral prefrontal cortex) as well as the functional connectivity between this one component and other 4 sub-components within the GPN network, was significantly related to conscientiousness ratings.

=== Empathy ===
Empathy, in the discussion here as a stable trait as in empathetic ability or capacity, can be defined as an affective response that "is similar to one's perception (directly experienced or imagined) and understanding (cognitive empathy) of the stimulus emotion, with recognition that the source of the emotion is not one's own", although there is still ongoing debate in the field on how to best define empathy. One sMRI study has demonstrated that inter subject variability in different facets of empathy is linked to neuroanatomical variation across different brain regions, such that (1) affective empathic abilities towards others were negatively correlated with the gray matter volumes of the precuneus, inferior frontal gyrus, and anterior cingulate, (2) cognitive perspective taking abilities were positively correlated with the gray matter volume of the anterior cingulate, and (3) the ability to empathize with fictional characters was positively linked to gray matter changes in the right dorsolateral prefrontal cortex. A meta-analysis of a series of fMRI studies have revealed that, when humans engage in empathetic processes, a network of brain regions are engaged, encompassing the insula, inferior frontal gyrus, medial frontal regions around the cingulate cortex, amygdala, thalamus, putamen, caudate, and primary somatosensory area SI. In addition to MRI studies, neuromodulation on mice and monkeys have shown that interference with oxytocin signaling causally influences empathy-related phenomena.

=== Genetic Factors ===
Prior research focused primarily on the causes of specific traits like extraversion, but 2018 research indicated that these individual traits do not alone determine personality. Researchers looked into the genes that are related to human personality. They identified the genes that interact with each other and one's environment to create personality. Around 1000 of such genes that affect temperament and character were found. This was further studied by looking at 1000 people in Germany and a 1000 people in Korea, and they found that in both countries and cultures, the genes for personality were all expressed in the brain. Around 33% of the genes were involved in the expression of temperament and character, while 67% of the genes were involved in either one or the other. These genes for character were expressed primarily in the brain circuits that regulate complex cognitive processes, such as goal seeking, conflict solving, and self-awareness. The genes were found to affect temperament and were expressed primarily in the habit learning pathways. Through these studies, these researchers were able to determine that the components of personality are numerous complex profiles. They also found that many molecular pathways can cause the exact same personality trait. Furthermore, environmental influences had small interactions with the genes for temperament and character but still had significant influence.

== Challenges and future directions ==
As an interdisciplinary field that lie between personality psychology and neuroscience, personality neuroscience research may benefit both fields by informing the formation of neuroscience hypotheses and helping interpret findings through theoretical framework developed in personality psychology, and in turn, developing and refining personality models and theories with an enhanced understanding of underlying neurobiological mechanisms. Nonetheless, in the meantime, the interdisciplinary nature aggregates paradigmatic and methodological challenges from both fields.

One prominent challenge for neuroimaging studies that aim to investigate individual differences is the low statistical power as a result of small sample sizes due to the high cost of data collection. Personality neuroscience research can thus benefit from data-sharing among studies and collective efforts to aggregate large neuroimaging datasets that include personality measures, such as the Human Connectome Project (HCP) and the Adolescent Brain and Cognitive Development (ABCD) Study. Ongoing effort to collect data from more diverse sample is also recommended to allow for generalization of study results to a larger population or investigation of similarities/differences among diverse communities.

Another challenge is to establish reliable, systematic, and high-quality measurement of personality traits. Unlike intelligence tests that are performance-based, personality questionnaires are susceptible to biases as mentioned in earlier sections. As the theories of personality psychology continues to evolve and develop, extensive psychometric research may need to be conducted on various types of scales or assessments that are used to measure psychological traits to ensure that they produce reliable measures of personality variables of interest.

One other challenge is that personality neuroscience is a relatively young field. Because of this, many of the previously published studies may be proven to be false positives due to under-powered studies that use small samples. Larger sample sizes are needed to detect smaller effects, which are common in personality neuroscience. A sample size of around 200 is needed to have 80% power and detect a correlation .2, which is often the average effect size in personality neuroscience. Thus, larger sample sizes are a needed change for this field.

The complexity of both the brain and personality traits poses additional challenge to the interdisciplinary field of personality neuroscience which studies the relationship between these two complex systems. Current research suggests that there exists no one-to-one mapping between neurobiological and personality variables: multiple brain regions or neurochemical processes may underlie one trait variable, while in turn, one brain region or neurochemical processes may be instrumental for several cognitive and affective processes that may influence multiple traits. As a result, personality network neuroscience approaches, integrating quantitative methodologies from network analysis, have been proposed to encode the complex nature of both neural mechanisms and personality variables as networks to facilitate the investigation the brain-personality relationship.

== See also ==
- Affective neuroscience
- Network neuroscience
- Personality psychology
- Social cognitive neuroscience
- Social neuroscience
- Social psychology
