= Stressor =

Something that causes stress to an organism

A stressor is a chemical or biological agent, environmental condition, external stimulus or an event seen as causing stress to an organism. Psychologically speaking, a stressor can be events or environments that individuals might consider demanding, challenging, and/or threatening individual safety.

Events or objects that may trigger a stress response may include:

- environmental stressors (hypo or hyper-thermic temperatures, elevated sound levels, over-illumination, overcrowding)
- daily "stress" events (e.g., traffic, lost keys, money, quality and quantity of physical activity)
- life changes (e.g., divorce, bereavement)
- workplace stressors (e.g., high job demand vs. low job control, repeated or sustained exertions, forceful exertions, extreme postures, office clutter)
- chemical stressors (e.g., tobacco, alcohol, drugs)
- social stressors (e.g., societal and family demands)

Stressors can cause physical, chemical and mental responses internally. Physical stressors produce mechanical stresses on skin, bones, ligaments, tendons, muscles and nerves that cause tissue deformation and (in extreme cases) tissue failure. Chemical stresses also produce biomechanical responses associated with metabolism and tissue repair. Physical stressors may produce pain and impair work performance. Chronic pain and impairment requiring medical attention may result from extreme physical stressors or if there is not sufficient recovery time between successive exposures. Stressors may also affect mental function and performance. Mental and social stressors may affect behavior and how individuals respond to physical and chemical stressors.

Social and environmental stressors and the events associated with them can range from minor to traumatic. Traumatic events involve very debilitating stressors, and oftentimes these stressors are uncontrollable. Traumatic events can deplete an individual's coping resources to an extent where the individual may develop acute stress disorder or even post-traumatic stress disorder. People who have been abused, victimized, or terrorized are often more susceptible to stress disorders. Most stressor-stress relationships can be evaluated and determined - either by the individual or by a psychologist. Therapeutic measures are often taken to help replenish and rebuild the individual's coping resources while simultaneously aiding the individual in dealing with current stress.

== Psychological stressors ==
Stressors occur when an individual is unable to cope with the demands of their environment (such as crippling debt with no clear path to resolving it). Generally, stressors take many forms, such as: traumatic events, life demands, sudden medical emergencies, and daily inconveniences, to name a few. There are also a variety of characteristics that a stressor may possess (different durations, intensity, predictability, and controllability).

=== Measuring psychological stress ===
Due to the wide impact and the far-reaching consequences of psychological stressors (especially their profound effects on mental well-being), it is particularly important to devise tools to measure such stressors. Two common psychological stress tests include the Perceived Stress Scale (PSS) devised by American psychologist Sheldon Cohen, and the Social Readjustment Rating Scale (SRRS) or the Holmes-Rahe Stress Scale. While the PSS is a traditional Likert scale, the SRRS assigns specific predefined numerical values to stressors.

== Biological responses to stressors ==
Traumatic events or any type of shock to the body can cause an acute stress response disorder (ASD). The extent to which one experiences ASD depends on the extent of the shock. If the shock was pushed past a certain extreme after a particular period in time ASD can develop into what is commonly known as Post-traumatic stress disorder (PTSD). There are two ways that the body responds biologically in order to reduce the amount of stress an individual is experiencing. One thing that the body does to combat stressors is to create stress hormones, which in turn create energy reservoirs that are there in case a stressful event were to occur. The second way our biological components respond is through an individual's cells. Depending on the situation our cells obtain more energy in order to combat any negative stressor and any other activity those cells are involved in seize.

One possible mechanism of stressors influencing biological pathways involves stimulation of the hypothalamus, CRF (corticotropin release factor) causing the pituitary gland to releases ACTH (adrenocorticotropic hormone), which causes the adrenal cortex to secrete various stress hormones (e.g., cortisol). Stress hormones travel in the blood stream to relevant organs, e.g., glands, heart, intestines, triggering a flight-or-fight response. Between this flow there is an alternate path that can be taken after the stressor is transferred to the hypothalamus, which leads to the sympathetic nervous system; after which the adrenal medulla secretes epinephrine.

== Predictability and controllability ==
When individuals are informed about events before they occur, the magnitude of the stressor is less than when compared to individuals who were not informed of the stressor. For example, an individual would prefer to know when they have a deadline ahead of time in order to prepare for it in advance, rather than find out about the deadline the day of. In knowing that there is a deadline ahead of time, the intensity of the stressor is smaller for the individual, as opposed to the magnitude of intensity for the other unfortunate individual who found out about the deadline the day of. When this was tested, psychologists found that when given the choice, individuals had a preference for the predictable stressors, rather than the unpredictable stressors. The pathologies caused by the lack of predictability are experienced by some individuals working in fields of emergency medicine, military defense, disaster response and others.

Additionally, the degree to which the stressor can be controlled plays a variable in how the individual perceives stress. Research has found that if an individual is able to take some control over the stressor, then the level of stress will be decreased. During this study, it was found that the individuals become increasingly anxious and distressed if they were unable to control their environment. As an example, imagine an individual who detests baths in the Middle Ages, taking a bath. If the individual was forced to take the bath with no control over the temperature of the bath (one of the variables), then their anxiety and stress levels would be higher than if the individual was given some control over the environment (such as being able to control the temperature of the water).

Based on these two principles (predictability and control), there are two hypotheses that attempt to account for these preferences; the preparatory response hypothesis and safety hypothesis attempt to accommodate these preferences.

== Preparatory response hypothesis ==
The idea behind this hypothesis is that an organism can better prepare for an event if they are informed beforehand, as this allows them to prepare for it (biologically). In biologically preparing for this event beforehand, the individual is able to better decrease the event's aversiveness. In knowing when a potential stressor will occur (such as an exam), the individual could, in theory, prepare for it in advance, thus decreasing the stress that may result from that event.

== Safety hypothesis ==
In this hypothesis, there are two time periods, one in which is deemed safe (where there is no stressor), and one which is deemed unsafe (in which the stressor is present). This is similar to procrastination and cramming; during the safe intervals (weeks before an exam) the individual is relaxed and not anxious, and during the unsafe intervals (the day or night before the exam) the individual most likely experiences anxiety.

== See also ==
- Disturbance (ecology)
