= Sheldon Cohen =

American psychologist

- Born: October 11, 1947 (age 78)
- Citizenship: American
- Education: New York University, Ph.D.; Wayne State University, B.Phil.
- Known for: Perceived Stress Scale
- Awards: APA Award for Distinguished Scientific Contributions to Psychology (2004); James McKeen Cattell Fellow Award for Outstanding Lifetime Contribution to Research in Applied Psychology (2002)
- Scientific career
- Fields: Psychology, social psychology
- Workplaces: Carnegie Mellon University; University of Pittsburgh School of Medicine; University of Oregon
- Website: CMU.edu/Dietrich/Psychology/People/Core-Training-Faculty/Cohen-Sheldon

Sheldon Cohen (born October 11, 1947) is the Robert E. Doherty University Professor of Psychology at Carnegie Mellon University. He is the director of the Laboratory for the Study of Stress, Immunity and Disease. He is a member of the Department of Psychology at Carnegie Mellon and adjunct professor of Psychiatry and of Pathology at the University of Pittsburgh School of Medicine.

== Background ==
Cohen received a Bachelor of Philosophy degree from Monteith College at Wayne State University (Detroit) in 1969, and a Ph.D. in social psychology from New York University in 1973. He was Assistant to associate professor of psychology at the University of Oregon from 1973 through 1982, and has been a professor of psychology at Carnegie Mellon University (Pittsburgh) since 1982. He was named the Robert E. Doherty Professor of Psychology in 2003. Since 1990 he has also been an adjunct professor of Pathology and Psychiatry at the University of Pittsburgh School of Medicine as well as a member of the Pittsburgh Cancer Institute; from 1999 to 2010 he served as a member of the executive board of the National Institutes of Health Pittsburgh Mind-Body Center. In 1992 he served as the interim director of Pittsburgh Cancer Institute's Behavioral Medicine Program and was the co-director of Pittsburgh's Brain, Behavior, and Immunity Center from 1990 to 1999. He was also a member of the core groups of the John D. and Catherine T. MacArthur Foundation Research Network on Socioeconomic Status and Health and of the Fetzer Institute's Working Group on Psychosocial Factors in Asthma, and served as chair of the Robert Wood Johnson Foundation's Planning Group on Social Connectedness and Health.

Cohen was elected to the Institute of Medicine of the National Academy of Sciences in 2004. He is the recipient of the American Psychological Association's (APA) Award for Distinguished Scientific Contributions to Psychology (2004), the American Psychological Society's (Now Association for Psychological Science) James McKeen Cattell Fellow Award for Outstanding Lifetime Contribution to Research in Applied Psychology (2002), the APA's (Division 38) Award for Outstanding Contributions to Health Psychology as a Junior (1987) and Senior (2008) Investigator, the American Psychosomatic Society's Patricia R. Barchas Award for Significant Contributions to the Study of the Impact of Social Behavior on Physiology (2006). He has received the National Institute of Mental Health's Research Scientist Development (1987–1997), and Senior Scientist Awards (1997–2002). He was an American Psychological Association Distinguished Lecturer, and a British Psychological Association Senior Fellow Lecturer. His paper entitled "Social Support, Stress and the Buffering Hypothesis" was named a Current Contents Citation Classic; in 2003 he was named one of Science's Most Cited Authors by the Institute for Scientific Information.

Cohen's work focuses on the roles of stress, emotions, social support systems and personality in health and well-being. He published pioneering theoretical and empirical work on the effects of aircraft noise on health and development of schoolchildren, and on the roles of stress and social networks in physical and mental health. With colleagues he has developed a number of scales assessing psychological and social variables including the Perceived Stress Scale (PSS), the Interpersonal Support Evaluation Scale (ISEL), the Social Network Index (SNI), the Partner Interaction Questionnaire (PIQ) and the Cohen-Hoberman Inventory of Physical Symptoms (CHIPS). Over the last 30 years he has studied the effects of psychological stress, social support, and social status on immunity and susceptibility to infectious disease. This work attempts to identify the neuroendocrine, immune, and behavioral pathways that link stress, personality, and social networks to disease susceptibility. He is also involved in studies of the effects of psychosocial factors on the onset and progression of asthma, and on the effectiveness of social support interventions in facilitating psychological adjustment and disease progression in women with breast cancer. His current work focuses on how interpersonal dispositions and behaviors influence immunity, host resistance to infectious disease, and on identifying biological pathways linking stress to disease. His research has been published in the New England Journal of Medicine, the Journal of the American Medical Association, the Journal of the National Cancer Institute, and the American Journal of Public Health in addition to other medical, public health, and sociology journals as well as in numerous psychology journals.

== Awards and memberships ==
- 1987: American Psychological Association's (Division 38) Junior Investigator Award for Outstanding Contributions to Health Psychology
- 2002: American Psychological Society's (Now Association for Psychological Science) James McKeen Cattell Fellow Award for Outstanding Lifetime Contribution to Research in Applied Psychology
- 2003: Highly Cited Author, ISI (Institute for Scientific Information)
- 2004: Elected to IOM (Institute of Medicine)
- 2004: American Psychological Association, Award for Distinguished Scientific Contributions to Psychology
- 2006: American Psychosomatic Society's Patricia R. Barchas Award for Significant Contributions to the Study of the Impact of Social Behavior on Physiology
- 2008: American Psychological Association's (Division 38) Senior Investigator Award for Outstanding Contributions to Health Psychology
- 1996-2010: Member, Core Group John D. and Catherine T. MacArthur Foundation, Network on Social Economic (Socioeconomic) Status and Health.
- 2014: Named one of the 100 Extremely Eminent Psychologists of the Modern Era

== See also ==
- Perceived Stress Scale
