= Emily Falk =

American psychologist, neuroscientist, and professor of communication

- Education: Brown University; UCLA
- Scientific career
- Fields: Psychology; Neuroscience; Communication science
- Workplaces: University of Pennsylvania (2013-present); University of Michigan (2010-2013)
- Doctoral advisor: Matthew Lieberman
- Website: www.falklab.org

Emily B. Falk is an American psychologist and neuroscientist, and professor of communication at the Annenberg School for Communication at the University of Pennsylvania, holding secondary appointments in psychology and marketing. She is the author of the 2025 book What We Value: The Neuroscience of Choice and Change.

== Biography ==
Falk received a Sc.B. in neuroscience from Brown University, an M.A. in psychology from the University of California, Los Angeles, and a Ph.D. in psychology from the University of California, Los Angeles. Falk was an assistant professor of communication at the University of Michigan and a faculty associate of the University of Michigan Institute for Social Research, before her appointment at the University of Pennsylvania.

== Research ==
Falk directs the Communication Neuroscience Lab, a research laboratory that takes an interdisciplinary communication neuroscience approach to link neural activity to individual, group, and population behaviors. Specific research lines include predicting behavior change (including changes in sunscreen use, tobacco smoking, and sedentary behavior) following exposure to persuasive messages. Another line of research links neural responses to health messages to population level behavioral outcomes.

Her most cited peer-reviewed research articles are:

- Bayer, J. B., Ellison, N. B., Schoenebeck, S. Y., & Falk, E. B. (2016). Sharing the small moments: Ephemeral social interaction on Snapchat. Information, Communication & Society, 19(7), 956–977. Cited by 426 as of April 2021.
- Falk, E. B., Berkman, E. T., Mann, T., Harrison, B., & Lieberman, M. D. (2010). Predicting persuasion-induced behavior change from the brain. Journal of Neuroscience, 30(25), 8421–8424. Cited by 326 as of April 2021.
- Falk, E. B., Berkman, E. T., & Lieberman, M. D. (2012). From neural responses to population behavior: Neural focus group predicts population-level media effects. Psychological Science, 23(5), 439–445. Cited by 286 as of April 2021.

== Awards and distinctions ==
Falk has received many awards for her work, including the 2012 National Institutes of Health Director's New Innovator Award, the 2017 International Communication Association (ICA) Early Career Scholar Award (then known as the Young Scholar Award), and the 2020 Social & Affective Neuroscience Society (SANS) Early Career Award.
