= Patricia Barchas =

Anthropologist and behavioral neurobiologist

Patricia R. Barchas
- Born: 1934; Chickasha, Oklahoma, United States
- Died: 1993 (aged 58–59)
- Education: University of Chicago, Chicago, Illinois; USA
- Known for: Sociophysiology; Social Neuroscience
- Awards: American Association for the Advancement of Science
- Scientific career
- Fields: Anthropology; Social neuroscience
- Workplaces: Stanford University (professor)

Patricia Barchas (1934–1993) was a scholar committed to the study of the interaction of social behavior and physiological processes. She was a pioneer in the study of brain electrical activity and hormonal function in social processes, such as the development of status hierarchies in small social groups.

== Background ==
Patricia Barchas was a pioneer in the field of sociophysiology - the effects of social behavior on the brain. She can be considered as one of the founder of social neuroscience. A native of Chickasha, Oklahoma, Dr. Barchas grew up in Los Angeles. She attended Pomona College, where she earned a bachelor's degree in English and History in 1956. She then went on to earn her master's in education from the University of Chicago. In 1971, she earned her doctorate in sociology at Stanford. She also spent many years studying neurophysiology and endocrinology. While at Pomona, she met her future husband, psychiatrist Jack Barchas who served for many years on Stanford's psychiatry faculty. Early in her career, Dr. Barchas taught emotionally disturbed children. Later, she joined the faculty of Stanford's Department of Sociology. She also served as a senior research associate in the Department of Psychiatry and Behavioral Sciences, where she headed the Program in Sociophysiology of the Division of Child Psychiatry and Development. Most recently, she was a member of the research staff at the University of California-Los Angeles School of Medicine.

== Academic achievements ==
Patricia Barchas discovered that small amounts of alcohol could alter the formation and retention of social hierarchies in humans; showed that humans and non-human primates form new social hierarchies in analogous ways; and provided evidence that groups of human females and groups of human males use different social processes in solving problems, with the females being more consensual. Barchas was co-author of a report commissioned by Congress, dealing with aggression and violence, and was a co-author of an Institute of Medicine report dealing with mental disorders and substance abuse. Books authored by Barchas include Social Cohesion, Social Hierarchies, and Sociophysiology.

== Patricia R. Barchas Award ==
The Patricia R. Barchas award in sociophysiology was established through a gift of a permanent endowment to the American Psychosomatic Society. The goal of the Barchas family in providing the endowment is that the recipient of the award be an individual (or more than one individual if they constitute a team) who is making or has made significant contributions to the study of the ways in which social behavior impacts on the physiology of the body in humans or in animals.

== Selected publications ==
- Barchas, P. R. (1976). Physiological sociology: interface of sociological and biological processes. Annual Review of Sociology, vol 2, 299-333.
- Barchas, P. R. (1986). A sociophysiological orientation to small groups. Advances in Group Processes, vol 3, 209-246.

== Books ==
- Barchas, P. R. 1984. Social hierarchies. London: Greenwood Press.
- Barchas, P. R. 1984. Social Cohesion: Essays Toward A Sociophysiological Perspective. London: Greenwood Press.

== See also ==
- Biological Psychology
- Biology
- Neuropeptides
- Neuroscience
- Evolution
- Social cognition
- Social Neuroscience
- Sociology
