= Gary Berntson =

American psychologist (born 1945)

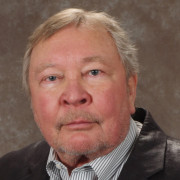
- Born: 1945 (age 80–81); Minneapolis, U.S.
- Education: University of Minnesota, Minneapolis
- Known for: Co-founder of Social neuroscience
- Scientific career
- Fields: Social neuroscience and biological psychology
- Workplaces: Ohio State University (professor)

Gary Berntson (born 1945) is an emeritus professor at Ohio State University with appointments in the departments of psychology, psychiatry and pediatrics. He is an expert in psychophysiology, neuroscience, biological psychology, and with his colleague John Cacioppo, a founding father of social neuroscience. His research attempts to elucidate the functional organization of brain mechanisms underlying behavioral and affective processes, with a special emphasis on social cognition.

== Education ==
Berntson studied biology and psychology at the University of Minnesota, and was awarded a Ph.D. (psychobiology and life sciences) in 1971. He then worked as a post-doc fellow with Neal Miller at Rockefeller University in the department of psychology between 1971 and 1973. Since 1973, Berntson is on the faculty at the Ohio State University.

== Research interests ==
The broad interest of Berntson's program is in the elucidation of the functional organization of brain mechanisms underlying behavioral and affective processes, with a special emphasis on social neuroscience. The program is guided conceptually by a recognition of the importance of multiple levels of analyzes in a meaningful understanding of complex neurobehavioral relations, and the strategic approach is collaborative and multidisciplinary in nature. This is illustrated by current research on anxiety and autonomic control, which ranges from basic animal studies of central neural and neuropharmacological mechanisms, to human research that examines the links between psychological processes and autonomic as well as immune functions. Central to this program of research is an effort to understand, at a theoretical level, the organizational principles that characterize psychobiological relations. Recent collaborative research includes: a) the role of cognitive and social factors in autonomic regulation and immune functions, b) contribution of cortical/cognitive processes to anxiety, and the neural systems that mediate these relations, c) the impact of autonomic states on higher neural systems, d) the integrative organization of neurobehavioral, neuroendocrine, autonomic and immune systems, and e) psychoneuroimmunology and the social neuroscience of health and disease.

== Selected books ==
- Berntson, G.G. & Cacioppo, J.T. (2009). Handbook of Neuroscience for the Behavioral Sciences. Wiley. ISBN 978-0470083550.
- Cacioppo, J.T., Tassinary, L.G., & Berntson, G. G. (2017). Handbook of Psychophysiology. Cambridge University Press.
- Cacioppo, J.T., Berntson, G.G., & Adolphs, R. (2002). Foundations in Social Neuroscience. MIT Press.
- Cacioppo, John; Berntson, Gary (2005-01-27). Social Neuroscience: Key Readings (Key Readings in Social Psychology). Psychology Press Ltd. ISBN 978-1-84169-099-5.

== Selected recent articles ==
- Grossman, P., Ackland, G. L., Allen, A. M., Berntson, G. G., Booth, L. C., Burghardt, G. M., Buron, J., Dinets, V., Doody, J. S., Dutschmann, M., Farmer, D. G. S., Fisher, J. P., Gourine, A. V., Joyner, M. J., Karemaker, J. M., Khalsa, S. S., Lakatta, E. G., Leite, C., Mcefield, V. G., ... & Zucker, I. H. (2026). "Why the polyvagal theory is untenable. An international expert evaluation of the polyvagal theory and commentary upon Porges, S.W. (2025). Polyvagal theory: current status, clinical applications, and future directions." Clin. Neuropsychiatry, 22(3), 169-184. Clinical Neuropsychiatry, 23(1), 100-112. doi.org/10.36131/cnfioritieditore20260110
- Norman GJ, Morgan E, Raja S, Berntson GG. (2026). "Wearable ANS monitoring in real life: A Critical review of context-sensitive interpretation and implications for psychophysiology." Autonomic Neuroscience. 263:103364. doi: 10.1016/j.autneu.2025.103364. PMID 41506124.
- Norman, G. J., Estrepo, A. R., Berntson, G. G. (2025). "Social Neuroscience: Bridging Social and Biological Levels of Analysis." In Kalkhoff, W., Dippong J., & Firat, R. B. (eds). Handbook of Neurosociology, Springer, NY.
- Quigley, K S., Gianaros, P. J., Norman, G. J., Jennings, J. R., Berntson, G. G., de Geus, E. J. C. (2024). Publication guidelines for human heart rate and heart rate variability studies in psychophysiology-Part 1: Physiological underpinnings and foundations of measurement. Psychophysiology, 61(9): e14604. doi: 10.1111/psyp.14604. Epub 2024 Jun 14. PMID 38873876.
- Norman, G. J., Faig, K. & Berntson, G.G. (2024). "Emotion & the Autonomic Nervous System" in Grafman, J. H. (ed.) Encyclopedia of the Human Brain, 2nd edition. New York: Elsevier. ISBN 9780128204801
- Berntson G. G. & Norman G. J. (2021). Multilevel analysis: Integrating multiple levels of neurobehavioral systems. Social Neuroscience. Feb;16(1):18-25. doi: 10.1080/17470919.2021.1874513. PMID 33442999
- Berntson, G. G. & Khalsa, S. S. (2020). Neural Circuits of Interoception. (Special section on Interoception; ed. Wen, C.) Trends in Neurosciences. 44(1):17-28. doi: 10.1016/j.tins.2020.09.011. PMID 33378653
- Berntson, G. G. & Khalsa, S. S. (2021). Neural Circuits of Interoception. (Special section on Interoception; ed. Wen, C.) Trends in Neurosciences. 44: 17–28. PMID 33378653 DOI: 10.1016/j.tins.2020.09.011
- Berntson, G. G., Gianaros, P. J. & Tsakiris, M. (2019). Interoception. In Tsakiris, M. & Priester, H. (eds.). The interoceptive basis of the mind. (pp. 3–26). Oxford, England. Oxford University Press.
- Berntson, G. G. (2019). Presidential Address 2011. Autonomic modes of control and Health. Psychophysiology, 56(1):e13306. (pp 1–10). doi: 10.1111/psyp.13306.
- Nederend, I., ten Harkel, A.D.J, Blom, N., Berntson, G. & de Geus, E.J.C. (2017). Impedance cardiography in healthy children and children with congenital heart disease: improving stroke volume assessment. International Journal of Psychophysiology, 120, 136–147.
- de Geus, E. J. C., Gianaros, P. J., Brindle, R. C., Jennings, J. R. & Berntson, G. G. (2017). Should heart rate variability be “corrected” for heart rate? Biological, quantitative, and interpretive considerations. Psychophysiology. 56(2):e13287. (pp. 1–26). doi: 10.1111/psyp.13287.
- Norman, G.J. Necka, E.A. Berntson, G.J., (2016). Psychophysiological measures of emotion. In Meiselman, H. (ed.). Emotion Measurement. (pp 83–98) Sawston, UK: Woodhead Publishing.
- Norman, G. J., Berntson, G. G. & Cacioppo, J. T. (2014). Emotion, Somatovisceral Afference and Autonomic Regulation. Emotion Review, 6, 113–123.
- Krzywickia, A. T., Berntson, G. G., & O’Kane, B. L. (2014). A Non-Contact Technique for Measuring Eccrine Sweat Gland Activity Using Passive Thermal Imaging. International Journal of Psychophysiology, 94,25-34.

== See also ==
- Anxiety
- Affective neuroscience
- Autonomic nervous system
- Immunology
- Biological psychology
- Neuroscience
- Social neuroscience
