= Julian Paul Keenan =

American neuroscientist

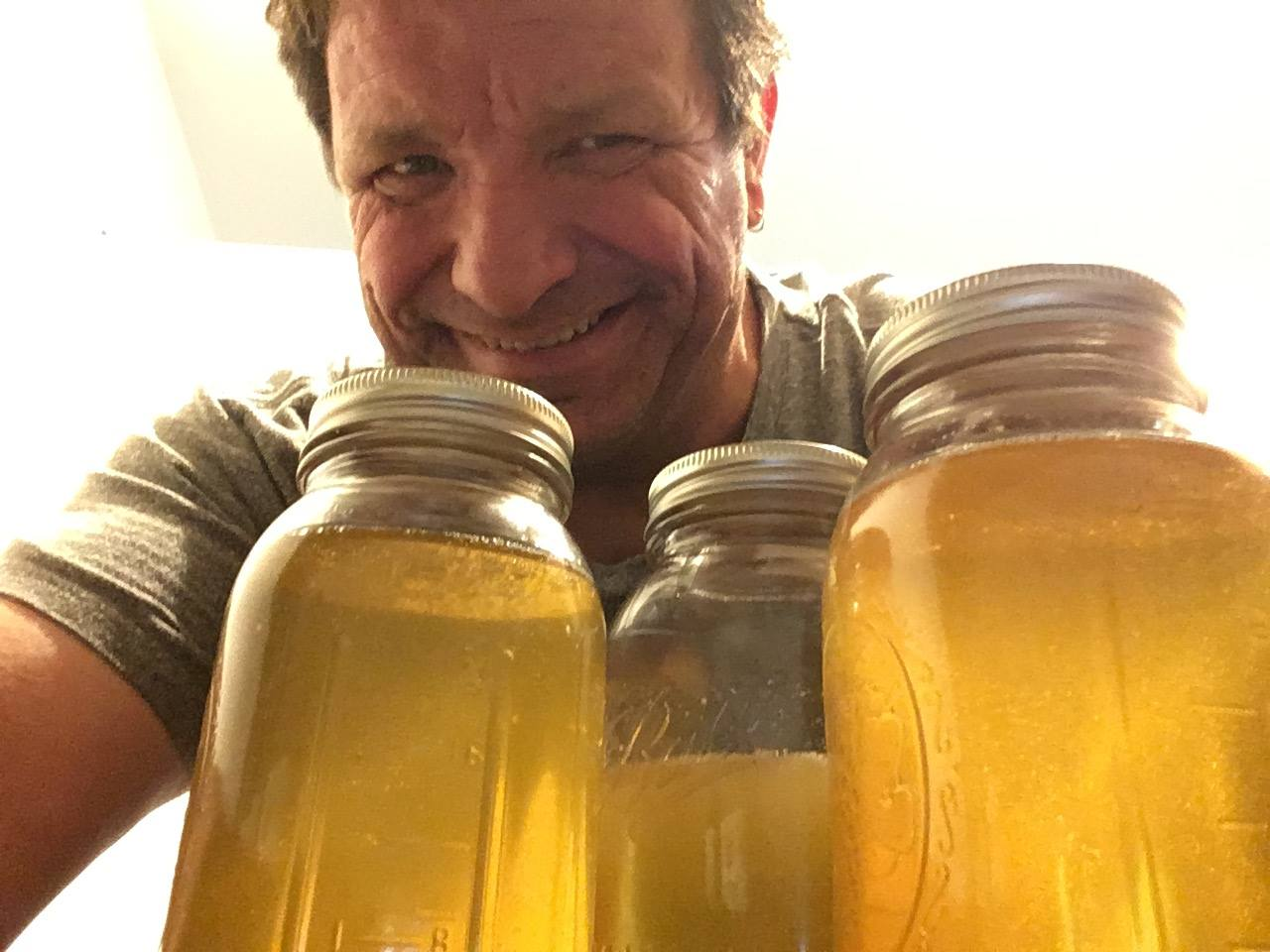
Julian Keenan with honey from his bees

Julian Paul Keenan (born December 8, 1969) is a professor of psychology and biology at Montclair State University and director of the Cognitive Neuroimaging Laboratory. He was previously at Harvard Medical School and the Beth Israel Deaconess Medical Center in Boston.

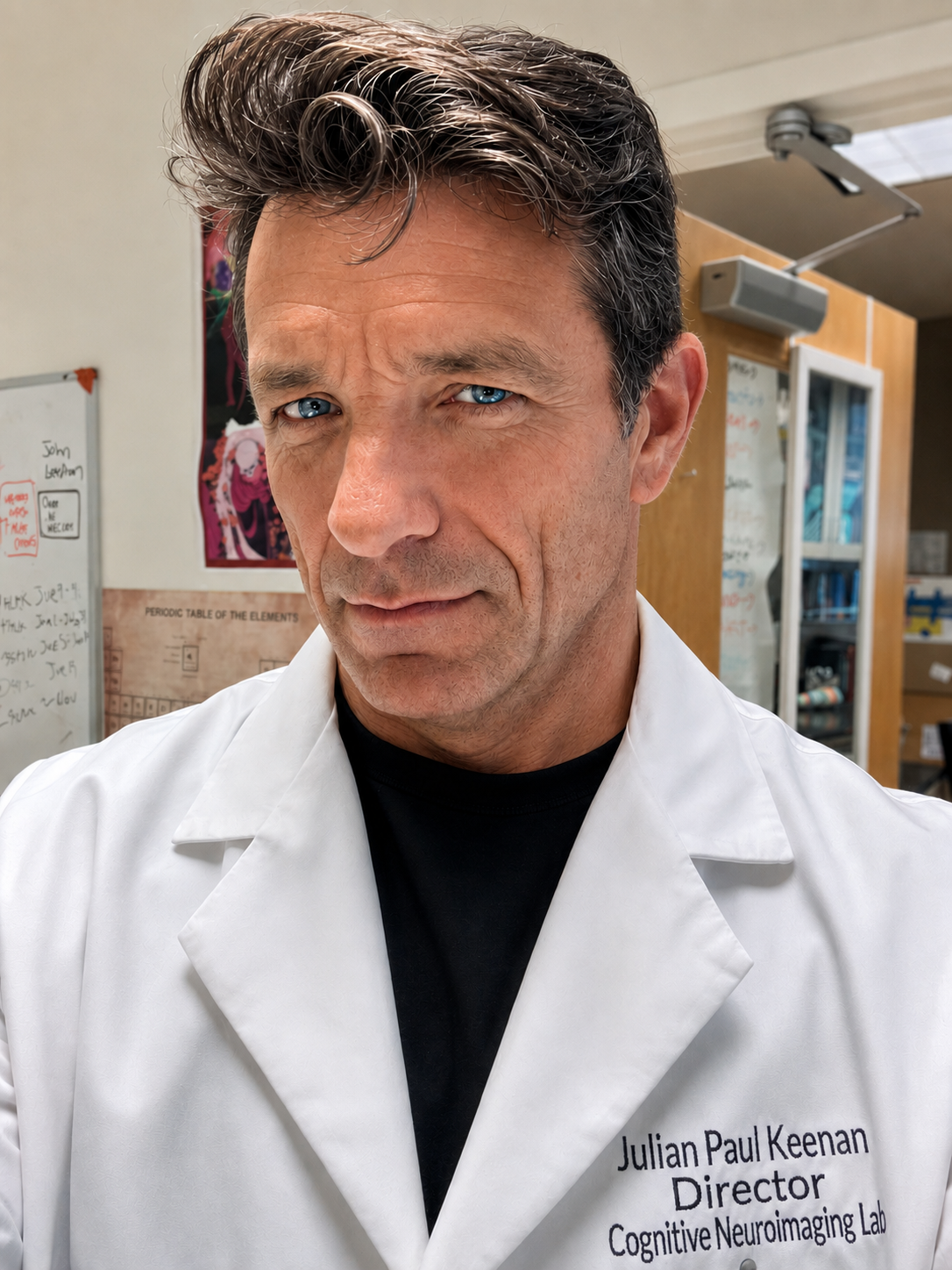
Julian Paul Keenan, PhD Director of the Cognitive Neuroimaging Laboratory

== Early life and education ==
Keenan was born on December 8, 1969, in New York City. He was educated at State University of New York at New Paltz, The Pennsylvania State University, Ealing College, The University at Albany, and Harvard Medical School between 1987 and 2001.

== Career ==
Keenan joined the faculty at Montclair State University in 2001 where he established the Cognitive Neuroimaging Laboratory. In 2012, NJ.com named him one of the 20 most impactful intellects in New Jersey.

He is the founding editor of the journal Social Neuroscience and has published his work in Science and Nature.

He discovered that the brain correlates of self-face recognition are mediated in the right hemisphere. His lab further determined the critical role the medial prefrontal cortex plays in deception and self-deception.

He was an early adopter of transcranial magnetic stimulation (TMS) for use in cognitive neuroscience and continues to employ it in his current research.

His work has reached the public through major media outlets including Radio Lab and Hulu.

In graduate school, Keenan established himself as an ardent supporter of equal rights in neuroscience with his very first publication discrediting The Bell Curve, a racially-charged popular press book. His work in with Keith Whitfield, president of the University of Nevada, Las Vegas, while very brief, inspired Keenan to create the Erase Racism in Neuroscience project. This work has led to the first publication on how to effectively provide TMS in hair typified by minority populations. Keenan also served as the President of the AFT 1904, a union representing Montclair State University.

== Books ==
He has authored and edited numerous books including:

- The Face in the Mirror (2004) ISBN 978-0060012809
- The Lost Self (2005) ISBN 978-0195173413
- ASVAB – The Best Test Prep (2005) ISBN 978-0738601083
- Evolutionary Cognitive Neuroscience (2006) ISBN 978-0262162418
- The Handbook of Research Methods in Health Psychology (2020) ISBN 978-1138595347
- Self-Face Recognition and the Brain (2023)
- When Animals Die: Examining Justifications and Envisioning Justice (2024) ISBN 978-1479818884
- Neuroscience on a Budget: The Essential Guide to Running a Lab, Securing Funding and Publishing your Research when Resources are Limited (In Press) Cambridge University Press.
