= Matthew Lieberman =

American professor in psychology

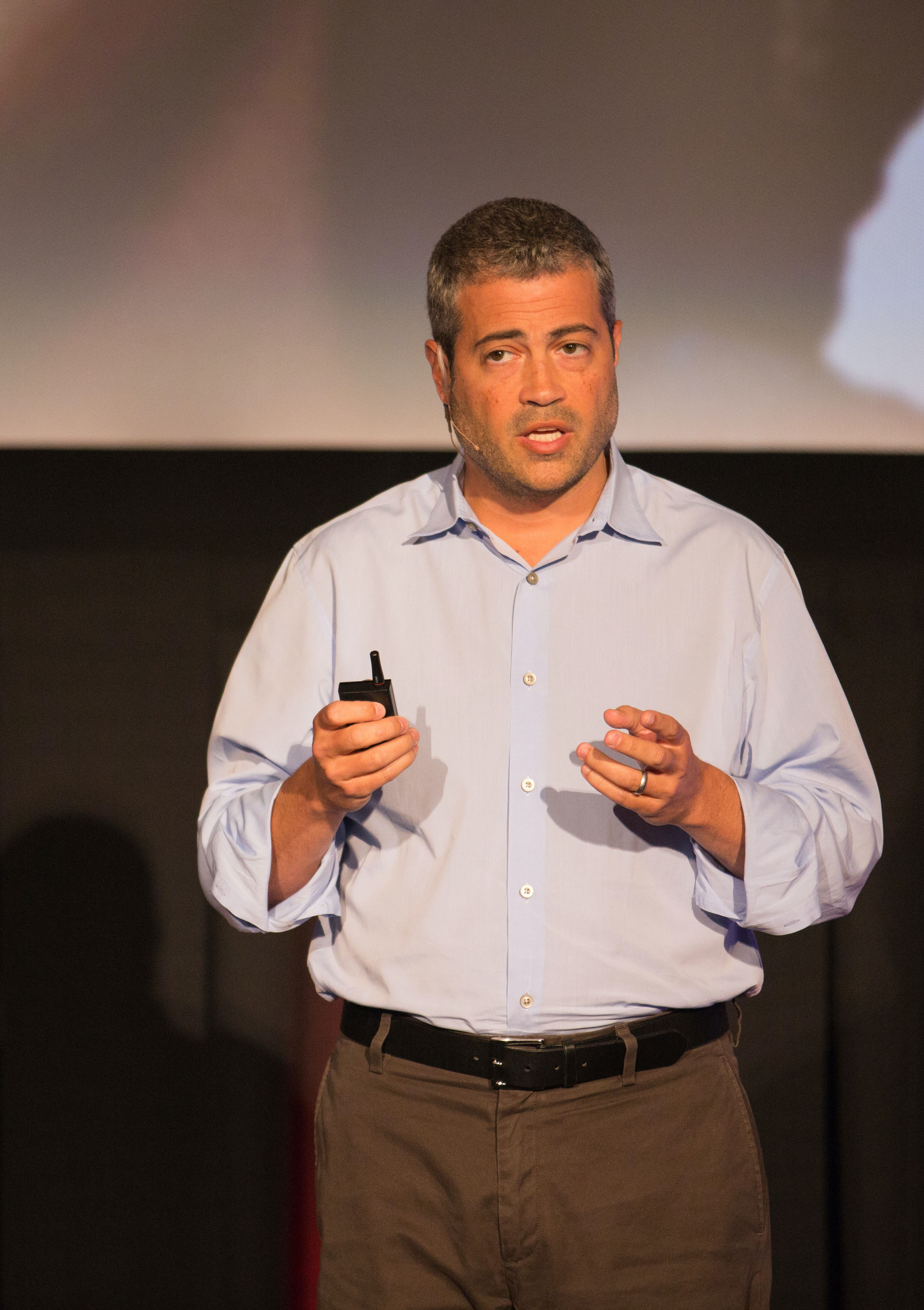
- Lieberman lecturing in 2013
- Born: May 5, 1970 (age 56); Atlantic City, NJ.
- Education: Rutgers University; Harvard University
- Occupations: Social Psychologist, Neurologist, Professor
- Spouse: Naomi Eisenberger
- Scientific career
- Workplaces: University of California, Los Angeles (UCLA)
- Notable students: David Amodio; Molly J. Crockett; Emily Falk; Sean Young

Matthew Dylan Lieberman is an American researcher and professor of psychology at the University of California, Los Angeles (UCLA). His primary research areas are in social neuroscience, affective neuroscience, and social psychology.

== Personal life and education ==
Lieberman was born on May 5, 1970, in Atlantic City, New Jersey. His father was a lawyer and his mother an art teacher. His wife, Naomi Eisenberger, is a full professor on the UCLA Psychology Department faculty.

Lieberman received his PhD from Harvard University.

== Research and career ==
Lieberman's work has been funded by the National Institute of Mental Health, National Science Foundation, Guggenheim Foundation, DARPA, and the Office of Naval Research.

Lieberman conducts research into the neural bases of social cognition and social experience, with particular emphasis on the neural bases of emotion regulation, persuasion, social rejection, self-knowledge, theory of mind, and fairness. Lieberman coined the term social cognitive neuroscience. His research interests also include Neural Bases of Automatic and Controlled Social Cognition & Affect and Neural Bases of Personality. Social cognitive neuroscience focuses on how the human brain carries out social information processing. Lieberman uses functional neuroimaging (fMRI) and neuropsychology to test new hypotheses regarding social cognition.

Lieberman is the founding editor of the journal, Social Cognitive and Affective Neuroscience.

In 2007, he won the APA Distinguished Scientific Award for an Early Career Contribution to Psychology.

In 2011, he received the UCLA Gold Shield Faculty Prize.

== Selected publications ==
- Lieberman, M. D. (2013). Social: Why our brains are wired to connect. New York, NY: Crown
- Lieberman, M. D. (2010). Social cognitive neuroscience. In S. T. Fiske, D. T. Gilbert, & G. Lindzey (Eds). Handbook of Social Psychology (5th ed.) (pp. 143–193). New York, NY: McGraw-Hill.
- Falk, E. B., Berkman, E. T., Mann, T., Harrison, B, & Lieberman, M. D. (2010). Predicting persuasion-induced behavior change from the brain. Journal of Neuroscience, 30, 8421–8424.
- Lieberman, M. D., Eisenberger, N. I., Crockett, M. J., Tom, S., Pfeifer, J. H., Way, B. M. (2007). Putting feelings into words: Affect labeling disrupts amygdala activity to affective stimuli. Psychological Science, 18, 421–428.
- Eisenberger, N. I., Lieberman, M. D., & Williams, K. D. (2003). Does rejection hurt? An fMRI study of social exclusion. Science, 302, 290–292.
