= Abraham Palmer =

American behavior geneticist

Abraham A. Palmer
- Born: Abraham Amos Palmer
- Education: University of Chicago; University of California, San Diego
- Awards: International Behavioural and Neural Genetics Society Distinguished Investigator Award (2020)
- Scientific career
- Fields: Behavior genetics; Psychiatry
- Institutions: University of California, San Diego
- Thesis: A functional neuroanatomical study of the autonomic response to the airpuff startle stimulus (1999)
- Doctoral advisor: Morton P. Printz

Abraham A. Palmer is an American behavior geneticist and Professor & Vice Chair for Basic Research in the Department of Psychiatry at the University of California, San Diego. In 2020, he was named a fellow of the American Association for the Advancement of Science. He is also a fellow of the International Behavioural and Neural Genetics Society (IBANGS) and the American College of Neuropsychopharmacology, and received the IBANGS Distinguished Investigator Award in 2020.
