= Perceived Stress Scale =

- Purpose: degree to which situations in one’s life are appraised as stressful

The Perceived Stress Scale was developed to measure the degree to which situations in one’s life are appraised as stressful. Psychological stress has been defined as the extent to which persons perceive (appraise) that their demands exceed their ability to cope.

The PSS was published in 1983, and has become one of the most widely used psychological instruments for measuring nonspecific perceived stress. It has been used in studies assessing the stressfulness of situations, the effectiveness of stress-reducing interventions, and the extent to which there are associations between psychological stress and psychiatric and physical disorders.

The PSS predicts both objective biological markers of stress and increased risk for disease among persons with higher perceived stress levels. For example, those with higher scores (suggestive of chronic stress) on the PSS fend worse on biological markers of aging, cortisol levels, immune markers, depression, infectious disease, wound healing, and prostate-specific antigen levels in men.

The Perceived Stress scale was developed by Sheldon Cohen and his colleagues.

== History ==
Prior to the development of the PSS, assessment of stress tended to focus on objective indicators (e.g., frequencies) of specific stressors (e.g., chronic illness, family loss, new family members). This tendency subsequently overlooks the influence an individual’s subjective interpretation of a stressor might have upon the experience of a stressor. Cohen et al. (1983) viewed the void of the subjective component in assessing stress as an unwanted quality and developed the PSS in response. Specifically, the PSS is based upon Lazarus's original transactional model of stress that argues the experience of a stressor is influenced by evaluations on the part of the person as to how well they can manage a stressor given their coping resources.

The original PSS consists of 14 items that are purported to form a unidimensional scale of global perceived stress. Although scores on the 14-item PSS tend to exhibit good reliability estimates across the literature, four of the items tend to perform poorly when evaluated using exploratory factor analysis. As a result, the PSS is commonly implemented using the 10-item form. Cohen et al. (1988) further reduced the PSS to a four item form for quick measurements; however, scores on the 4-item PSS tend to exhibit lower reliability estimates than researchers would like.

== Factor structure ==
Although Cohen et al. (1983) originally argued the PSS to be a unidimensional measure of perceived stress, the research community generally views the 14- and 10-item forms as two dimensional. The predominant forms consist of positively and negatively phrased items. Under exploratory factor analysis the negatively phrased items have been found to load onto a second factor separate from the positively phrased items, giving the appearance of a method effect. That is, a significant portion of the variability in the responses to a subset of the items is a product of how the items are phrased. However, inspection of the items suggests a substantive difference in the positively phrased items versus the negatively phrased items with the negatively phrased items on their face characterizing perceived helplessness while the positively phrased items may be characterizing perceived self-efficacy. Some support for this conceptualization has emerged. For example, Hewitt et al. (1992) found that the perceived helplessness items tended to predict depression in both men and women while the positively phrased items tended to predict depression in women only. The pattern of differential prediction of depression between genders tends to indicate the negatively phrased items are tapping something substantive rather than a method effect. Although the preponderance of evidence is on the side of a multidimensional measure, the issue has not been fully resolved owing in part to limitations in the methodological knowledge available on distinguishing between substantive and method variance.

== Reliability ==
Across diverse conditions, researchers report relatively satisfactory reliability estimates for scores on the 14- and 10-item forms. For example, Roberti et al. (2006) reported reliability estimates of .85 and .82 in a university sample for scores on the perceived helplessness and perceived self-efficacy scales, respectively. Highly similar results were reported in Taylor (2015) in a sample of middle-aged adults. However, one of the limitations for much of the reliability estimates reported in the extant literature is the overly restrictive requirement of tau-equivalence for accurate reliability estimates. Tau-equivalence requires each item of a scale to have approximately the same size of relationship with the unobserved characteristic (e.g., perceived self-efficacy) driving responses to the items as well as consistent reliability regardless of the latent level driving the responses to the items. Therefore, it is largely unknown whether items on the PSS assign scores with the same degree of reliability for respondents with high latent levels (e.g., perceived helplessness) as respondents with low latent levels. One exception is in Taylor (2015), where the graded response model was utilized to study the reliability levels across levels of the two latent variables. Taylor (2015) reported that the perceived self-efficacy and perceived helplessness subscales tended to estimate scores reliably across levels of the latent variables except among respondents with exceptionally low levels of perceived helplessness and exceptionally high levels of perceived self-efficacy. Finally, much less is known about the reliability of scores from the 4-item form.

== Translations and adaptations ==
Portuguese version: Journal article (free PDF) and scale only

== See also ==
- Psychological testing
