= Social Cognitive and Affective Neuroscience =

- Discipline: Social neuroscience
- Language: English
- Edited by: Matthew Lieberman

Publication details
- History: 2006-present
- Publisher: Oxford University Press
- Frequency: Monthly
- Impact factor: 4.2 (2022)

Standard abbreviations
- ISO 4: Soc. Cogn. Affect. Neurosci.

Indexing
- ISSN: 1749-5016 (print); 1749-5024 (web)
- LCCN: 2007206085
- OCLC no.: 71257314

Links
- Journal homepage

Social Cognitive and Affective Neuroscience is a monthly peer-reviewed scientific journal covering social neuroscience published by Oxford University Press. Its focus is on empirical research reports. According to the Journal Citation Reports, the journal has a 2022 impact factor of 4.2.
