= Naomi Eisenberger =

Psychologist and social psychology professor

Naomi I. Eisenberger
- Education: University of California, Los Angeles (UCLA) (PhD)
- Occupation: Professor of psychology
- Employer: UCLA
- Awards: APA Award for Distinguished Scientific Early Career Contributions to Psychology

Naomi I. Eisenberger (born in San Francisco) is a social psychologist known for her research on the neural basis of social pain and social connection. She is professor of social psychology at the University of California, Los Angeles (UCLA) where she directs the Social and Affective Neuroscience Laboratory and co-directs the Social Cognitive Science laboratory.

Eisenberger was the 2012 winner of the IUPsyS Young Investigator Award in Applied Science and the 2013 winner of the American Psychological Association Award for Distinguished Scientific Early Career Contributions to Psychology (area: Social Psychology)." Her award citation noted that "Eisenberger's innovative program of research has brought together neural, experiential, genetic and physiological measures to better define the role that social ties play in individuals’ emotional and physical well-being. Her discovery that the neural bases of social pain overlap with the neural bases of physical pain is a landmark finding in social neuroscience.

== Biography ==
Eisenberger grew up in San Francisco. She completed her undergraduate and graduate studies at UCLA, where she was mentored by Margaret Kemeny and Shelley Taylor.

Eisenberger is married to professor Matthew Lieberman and they have a son. Together they have co-authored several research papers.

== Research ==
Eisenberger's main interests (as listed on her personal website) are the neural basis of social rejection and social connection, and the relationship between social support and physical health. Her work in this area has emphasized the profound impact of social relationships on emotional and physical well-being. Her work suggests a connection between rejection and actual physical pain. For example, after a break up, one or both parties often complain of a broken heart.

Her most cited work explores social rejection and the neural regions it activates. According to Eisenberger, some of the same neural regions that are activated in response to physical pain are also activated when one feels socially excluded. The feeling of social exclusion can be caused by exclusion from one person or a group of people. Her paper Does Rejection Hurt? An fMRI study of social exclusion, tested the hypothesis that the brain bases of social pain are similar to those of physical pain by examining the brain activity of participants who were excluded while playing a virtual ball tossing game. Participants were subject to FMRI scans while playing the virtual ball game and experiencing social exclusion, with analyses focusing on activity in the anterior cingulate cortex. The anterior cingulate cortex is activated when an automatic response is "inappropriate". The automatic response caused by physical pain is a frequent activator of the anterior cingulate cortex. The participants' scans showed that the anterior cingulate cortex was more active during the game when they were excluded than when they were included. The study also showed that the right ventral prefrontal cortex was active during exclusion and regulated the distress of social exclusion by disrupting activity in the anterior cingulate cortex. Almost identical results were found in studying brain activity associated with self-regulation of physical pain, suggesting a correlation between the neural mechanisms underlying social pain and physical pain, in support of Eisenberger's hypothesis.
