= BPDFamily.com =

Online support group

- Founded: 2005; 21 years ago
- Founder: R. Skip Johnson MBA; Executive director
- Type: Peer Support Group for Family Members of a person with Borderline Personality Disorder
- Purpose: 1. Preserve the family 2. Healthier healing of failed relationships 3. Provide clinically reliable relationship tools and educational material
- Location: Austin, TX 75231-4596
- Region served: Multi-national (English speaking)
- Product: Internet based message board and knowledge base
- Members: 100,000
- Key people: John Cain MD; Clinical advisor
- Volunteers: 22
- Website: DMOZ listing January 2008. bpdfamily.com

BPDFamily.com is an online support group for the family members of individuals with borderline personality disorder (BPD). The group is one of the first "cyber" support groups to be recognized by the medical providers and receive professional referrals.

BPDFamily.com provides articles and message boards for family members to learn and share their experiences. The articles explain borderline personality disorder in understandable terms, and the discussion groups help to normalize the experiences of family members. The site appeals to family members who care about someone with borderline personality disorder, but are frustrated with the relationship demands and conflict.

The site educates its members on concepts developed by Shari Manning PhD, Margalis Fjelstad PhD, Robert O. Friedel MD, and the NEA-BPD Family Connections Program and reached out to academia for collaborations. The site has an interactive web program that teaches the basic principles of cognitive behavioral therapy.

The website and support group are certified as a reputable health information resource by the Health On the Net Foundation.

Funding has come from benefactors and member donations.

== Use by healthcare professionals ==
BPDFamily.com is a listed reference site of the National Health Service (England), the National Alliance on Mental Illness, the National Education Alliance for Borderline Personality Disorder, and the Personality Disorders Awareness Network.

The group's services and programs are recommended in Primer on Borderline Personality Disorder, Abnormal and Clinical Psychology: An Introductory Textbook, Resources to Improve Emotional Health and Strengthen Relationships, I Hate You--Don't Leave Me: Understanding the Borderline Personality, The Essential Family Guide to Borderline Personality Disorder, Stop Walking on Eggshells, and Discovering Your Inner Child: Transforming Toxic Patterns and Finding Your Joy. The site has been recommended by about.com expert Kristalyn Salters-Pedneault, PhD, Salon advice columnist Cary Tennis, PsychCentral columnist Kate Thieda, and by Randi Kreger at BPDCentral.

The organization has been involved and referenced in clinical research studies conducted by: Columbia University, University of Wollongong (Australia), California State University, Sacramento, University of Toronto (Canada), University of Nevada, Bowling Green State University, Wright Institute (California), Colorado School of Professional Psychology, Long Island University, Alliant International University (California), Macquarie University (Australia), Middle Tennessee State University, Simon Fraser University (Canada) and Walden University. The organization also supports industry research studies conducted by the Treatment and Research Advancements Association for Personality Disorder (TARA-APD).

In a January 2013 column, Kristalyn Salters-Pedneault at Boston University School of Medicine says that although she highly recommends this group for family members, readers with borderline personality disorder should keep in mind that some people have been hurt by their family member with BPD and are speaking from this perspective.

== Traffic ==
At its peak in 2015, BPDFamily.com was listed by Alexa Internet as the most visited BPD website in the world, and it ranked 19th among all mental health websites.
