= Social Neuroscience =

- Discipline: Social neuroscience
- Language: English
- Edited by: Paul J. Eslinger

Publication details
- History: 2006–present
- Publisher: Psychology Press (United Kingdom)
- Frequency: Bimonthly
- Impact factor: 1.7 (2023)

Standard abbreviations
- ISO 4: Soc. Neurosci.

Indexing
- ISSN: 1747-0919 (print); 1747-0927 (web)
- LCCN: 2006244001
- OCLC no.: 69984013

Links
- Journal homepage; Online access; Online archive

Social Neuroscience is a peer-reviewed academic journal covering research in social neuroscience. It was founded in March 2006 by Jean Decety and Julian Paul Keenan. It is published by Psychology Press, a division of Taylor and Francis. The current editor is Paul J. Eslinger (Penn State Hershey Medical Center). According to the Journal Citation Reports, the journal has a 2023 impact factor of 1.7. Originally, it published 3 issues per year (with the last issue being a double one).
