= Social neuroscience =

Study of the neural mechanisms of socialization

Social neuroscience is an interdisciplinary field devoted to understanding the relationship between social experiences and biological systems. Humans are fundamentally a social species, and studies indicate that various social influences, including life events, poverty, unemployment and loneliness can influence health related biomarkers. Still a young field, social neuroscience is closely related to personality neuroscience, affective neuroscience and cognitive neuroscience, focusing on how the brain mediates social interactions. The biological underpinnings of social cognition are investigated in social cognitive neuroscience.

The term "social neuroscience" can be traced to a publication entitled "Social Neuroscience Bulletin" which was published quarterly between 1988 and 1994. The term was subsequently popularized in an article by John Cacioppo and Gary Berntson, published in the American Psychologist in 1992. Cacioppo and Berntson are considered as the legitimate fathers of social neuroscience.

== Overview ==
Traditional neuroscience has for many years considered the nervous system as an isolated entity and largely ignored influences of the social environments in which humans and many animal species live. In fact, we now recognize the considerable impact of social structures on the operations of the brain and body. These social factors operate on the individual through a continuous interplay of neural, neuroendocrine, metabolic and immune factors on brain and body, in which the brain is the central regulatory organ and also a malleable target of these factors. Social neuroscience investigates the biological mechanisms that underlie social processes and behavior, widely considered one of the major problem areas for the neurosciences in the 21st century, and applies concepts and methods of biology to develop theories of social processes and behavior in the social and behavioral sciences. Social neuroscience capitalizes on biological concepts and methods to inform and refine theories of social behavior, and it uses social and behavioral constructs and data to advance theories of neural organization and function.

Throughout most of the 20th century, social and biological explanations were widely viewed as incompatible. But advances in recent years have led to the development of a new approach synthesized from the social and biological sciences. The new field of social neuroscience emphasizes the complementary relationship between the different levels of organization, spanning the social and biological domains (e.g., molecular, cellular, system, person, relational, collective, societal) and the use of multi-level analyses to foster understanding of the mechanisms underlying the human mind and behavior.

Contemporary insights into the origins of social interactions raise interest in hyperscanning or intercranial research. Studying the correlation of neuronal activities of two or more brains in shared cognitive tasks can contribute to understanding the relationship between social experiences and neurophysiological processes.

== Methods ==
A number of methods are used in social neuroscience to investigate the confluence of neural and social processes. These methods draw from behavioral techniques developed in social psychology, cognitive psychology, and neuropsychology, and are associated with a variety of neurobiological techniques including functional magnetic resonance imaging (fMRI), magnetoencephalography (MEG), positron emission tomography (PET), facial electromyography (EMG), transcranial magnetic stimulation (TMS), electroencephalography (EEG), event-related potentials (ERPs), electrocardiograms, electromyograms, endocrinology, immunology, galvanic skin response (GSR), single-cell recording, and studies of focal brain lesion patients. In recent years, these methods have been complemented by virtual reality techniques (VR) and hormonal measures. Animal models are also important to investigate the putative role of specific brain structures, circuits, or processes (e.g., the reward system and drug addiction). In addition, quantitative meta-analyses are important to move beyond idiosyncrasies of individual studies, and neurodevelopmental investigations can contribute to our understanding of brain-behavior associations. The two most popular forms of methods used in social neuroscience are fMRI and EEG. fMRI are very cost efficient and high in spatial resolution. However, they are low in temporal resolution and therefore, are best to discover pathways in the brain that are used during social experiments. fMRI have low temporal resolution (timing) because they read oxygenated blood levels that pool to the parts of the brain that are activated and need more oxygen. Thus, the blood takes time to travel to the part of the brain being activated and in reverse provides a lower ability to test for exact timing of activation during social experiments. EEG is best used when a researcher is trying to brain map a certain area that correlates to a social construct that is being studied. EEGs provide high temporal resolution but low spatial resolution. In which, the timing of the activation is very accurate but it is hard to pinpoint exact areas on the brain, researchers are to narrow down locations and areas but they also create a lot of "noise". Most recently, researchers have been using TMS which is the best way to discover the exact location in the process of brain mapping. This machine can turn on and off parts of the brain which then allows researchers to test what that part of the brain is used for during social events. However, this machine is so expensive that it is rarely used.

Note: Most of these methods can only provide correlations between brain mapping and social events (apart from TMS), a con of Social Neuroscience is that the research must be interpreted through correlations which can cause a decreased content validity. For example, during an experiment when a participant is doing a task to test for a social theory and a part of the brain is activated, it is impossible to form causality because anything else in the room or the thoughts of the person could have triggered that response. It is very hard to isolate these variables during these experiments. That is why self-reports are very important. This will also help decrease the chances of VooDoo correlations (correlations that are too high and over 0.8 which look like a correlation exists between two factors but actually is just an error in design and statistical measures). Another way to avoid this con, is to use tests with hormones that can infer causality. For example, when people are given oxytocin and placebos and we can test their differences in social behavior between other people. Using SCRs will also help isolate unconscious thoughts and conscious thoughts because it is the body's natural parasympathetic response to the outside world. All of these tests and devices will help social neuroscientists discover the connections in the brain that are used to carry out our everyday social activities.

Primarily psychological methods include performance-based measures that record response time and/or accuracy, such as the Implicit Association Test; observational measures such as preferential looking in infant studies; and, self-report measures, such as questionnaire and interviews.

Neurobiological methods can be grouped together into ones that measure more external bodily responses, electrophysiological methods, hemodynamic measures, and lesion methods. Bodily response methods include GSR (also known as skin conductance response (SCR)), facial EMG, and the eyeblink startle response. Electrophysiological methods include single-cell recordings, EEG, and ERPs. Hemodynamic measures, which, instead of directly measuring neural activity, measure changes in blood flow, include PET and fMRI. Lesion methods traditionally study brains that have been damaged via natural causes, such as strokes, traumatic injuries, tumors, neurosurgery, infection, or neurodegenerative disorders. In its ability to create a type of 'virtual lesion' that is temporary, TMS may also be included in this category. More specifically, TMS methods involve stimulating one area of the brain to isolate it from the rest of the brain, imitating a brain lesion. This is particularly helpful in brain mapping, a key approach in social neuroscience designed to determine which areas of the brain are activated during certain activities.

== Society for Social Neuroscience ==
A dinner to discuss the challenges and opportunities in the interdisciplinary field of social neuroscience at the Society for Neuroscience meeting (Chicago, November 2009) resulted in a series of meetings led by John Cacioppo and Jean Decety with social neuroscientists, psychologists, neuroscientists, psychiatrists, sociologists and economists in Argentina, Australia, Chile, China, Colombia, Hong Kong, Israel, Japan, the Netherlands, New Zealand, Singapore, South Korea, Taiwan, the United Kingdom and the United States. Social neuroscience was defined broadly as the interdisciplinary study of the neural, hormonal, cellular, and genetic mechanisms underlying the emergent structures that define social species. Thus, among the participants in these meetings were scientists who used a wide variety of methods in studies of animals as well as humans, and patients as well as normal participants. The consensus also emerged that a Society for Social Neuroscience should be established to give scientists from diverse disciplines and perspectives the opportunity to meet, communicate with, and benefit from the work of each other. The international, interdisciplinary Society for Social Neuroscience (http://S4SN.org) was launched at the conclusion of these consultations in Auckland, New Zealand on 20 January 2010, and the inaugural meeting for the Society was held on November 12, 2010, the day prior to the 2010 Society for Neuroscience meeting (San Diego, CA).

== See also ==
- Behavioral economics – Factors influencing economic decisions
- Biocultural evolution – Theory of human behavior
- Cognitive neuropsychology – Relation of brain structure to psychological processes
- Emotion – Conscious subjective experience
- Evolutionary psychology – Branch of psychology
- Motor cognition
- Neural synchrony – Correlation of brain activity across two or more people over time
- Neuroeconomics – Interdisciplinary field
- Personality neuroscience
- Social cognition – Study of cognitive processes involved in social interactions
- Social Cognitive and Affective Neuroscience
- Social cognitive neuroscience – Use of neuroscience in study of social cognition
- Social Neuroscience
- Social psychology – Study of social effects on people's thoughts, feelings, and behaviors
- Sociobiology – Subdiscipline of biology regarding social behavior
