= Jean Decety =

American neuroscientist

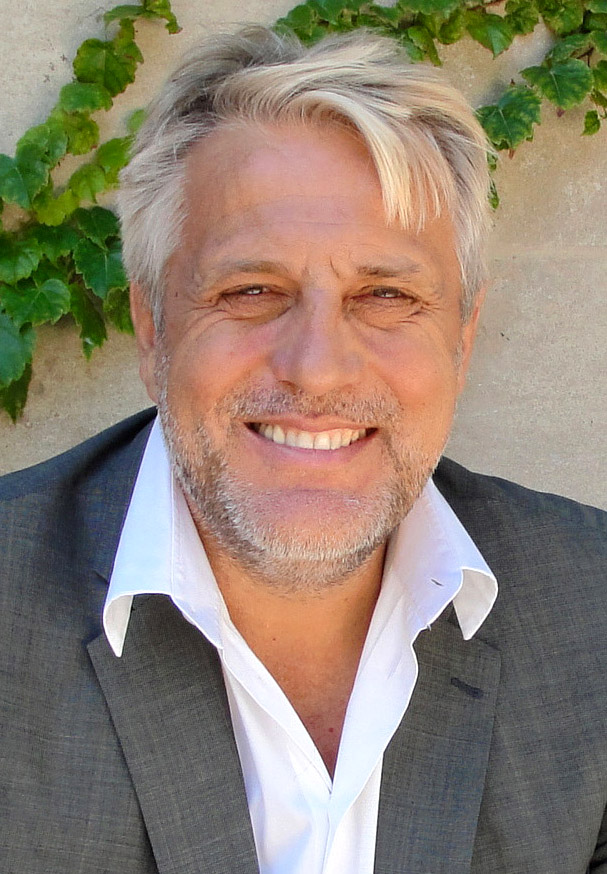
- Born: 1960 (age 65–66); France
- Education: Université Claude Bernard, Lyon; France
- Known for: Affective neuroscience; Empathy; Moral reasoning; Social Neuroscience; Psychopathy
- Scientific career
- Fields: Cognitive neuroscience, Developmental neuroscience, Social neuroscience
- Workplaces: University of Chicago (Professor)
- Notable students: Sarah-Jayne Blakemore

Jean Decety is an American–French neuroscientist known for his research on social cognition, particularly empathy, moral reasoning, and, prosocial behavior. He is a Professor at the University of Chicago.

== Background ==
Jean Decety earned a Ph.D. in 1989 (neuroscience) from the Université Claude Bernard. He then worked as a postdoctoral fellow at the hospital in Lund (Sweden) in the Department of Neurophysiology, and at the Karolinska Hospital, Stockholm (Sweden) in the Departments of Neurophysiology and Neuroradiology. He then joined the National Institute for Medical Research (INSERM) in Lyon (France) until 2001.

Decety currently holds a professorship at the University of Chicago and the College, with appointments in the Department of Psychology and in the Department of Psychiatry and Behavioral Neuroscience. He heads the Social Cognitive Neuroscience Laboratory. In 2022, Decety was elected as a member of the Academia Europaea, a pan-European Academy of Humanities, Letters, Law, and Sciences, in the Physiology and Neuroscience section.

== Mental simulation of actions ==
Mental simulation, also known as motor imagery, mental practice, or mental rehearsal, is the cognitive ability to imagine performing a specific action or behavior and simulate the probable outcome before execution. Research by Decety, using psychophysics, functional neuroimaging, H-reflex excitability, as well as measures of the autonomic nervous system, demonstrated that imagining an action activates similar neural representations that would be engaged by carrying out the same action. For instance, an increase in heart rate and respiratory rate is proportional to the level of mental effort in athletes who imagine running on a treadmill at different speeds. Imagining doing an action is associated with activation of the supplementary motor area, parietal cortex, somatosensory cortex, and cerebellum, brain regions involved in motor control. These findings have been interpreted as evidence of functional equivalence between the imagination and the production of action, to the extent that they share the same motor representations underpinned by the same neurophysiological substrate. This theoretical framework was subsequently extended to empathy and some aspects of social cognition.

== Empathy, moral reasoning and prosocial behavior ==
Decety's research examines the neurobiological and cognitive mechanisms that guide social decision-making, moral reasoning, empathy, as well as how these abilities develop in children and are shaped by life experiences and group dynamics. His work covers multiple aspects of empathy, including its evolutionary origins, its development in young children, as well as how empathy is modulated by the social environment and interpersonal relationships.

While empathy plays an important role in motivating caring for others and in guiding moral behavior, Decety's research indicates that this relationship is not systematic and varies with the other person's social identity and social context. He has proposed that empathic concern (compassion) evolved to favor kin and members of one's social group, and can bias social decision-making by prioritizing specific individuals, which can directly conflict with principles of fairness and justice.

== Empathy and psychopathy ==
A lack of empathy is a hallmark characteristic of psychopathy. Decety investigated atypical socioemotional processing and moral judgment in a forensic population with various levels of psychopathy using a mobile MRI scanner, because they provide a natural model in which emotional and attentional processes are altered, enabling identification of downstream effects, including the extent to which empathy is a critical input for caring.

== Moral conviction ==
Decety has explored the neural and cognitive mechanisms behind "the dark side of morality." The work shows that moral conviction can forster dogmatism, intolerance, and punitive actions violence. While violence is often described as antithetical to sociality, it can be motivated by moral values with the ultimate goal of regulating social relationships, as shown by the work of Alan Fiske. In fact, most violence in the world appears to be rooted in conflict between moral values.

== Controversies ==
In 2015, Decety and colleagues published a study examining religion and morality in children and found that children from households identifying as either of the two major world religions (Christianity and Islam) were less altruistic than children from non-religious households. The study used behavioral measures of punitive tendencies when evaluating interpersonal harm, moral judgment, empathy, and generosity (Dictator Game) in 1,151 children aged 5–12 years sampled from six countries (Canada, China, Jordan, South Africa, Turkey and USA). The authors reported that children from religious households believe that interpersonal harm is more "mean" and deserving of harsher punishment than non-religious children. They also reported that religiousness was inversely predictive of children's altruism at least when generosity is spontaneously directed to an anonymous beneficiary. The study received widespread attention, with news outlets citing it as evidence that religious children are more selfish than their secular counterparts.

However, Decety has since retracted the study, citing an analysis error that nullified the study's conclusion on religiosity and altruism. This came about after Azim F. Shariff reanalyzed the original data and observed that there was a mistake in the original study: coding country as a continuous rather than categorical variable. Once this error was corrected, as Shariff wrote, "most of the associations they observed with religious affiliation appear to be artifacts of between-country differences, driven primarily by low levels of generosity in Turkey and South Africa. However, children from highly religious households do appear slightly less generous than those from moderately religious ones." Decety has stated "When we reanalyzed these data to correct this error, we found that country of origin, rather than religious affiliation, is the primary predictor of several of the outcomes."
