= Neknominate =

Drinking game

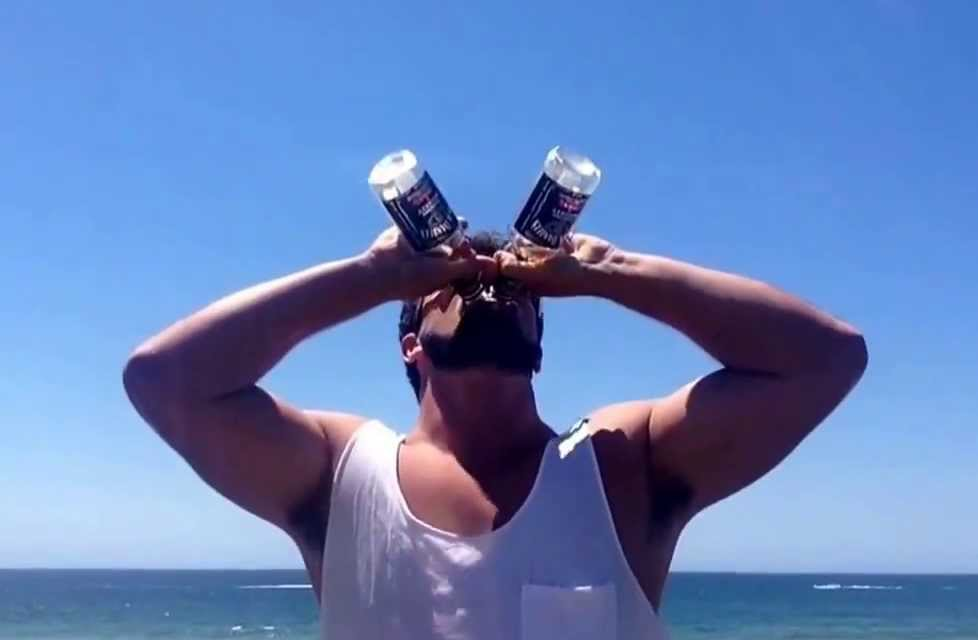
A still taken from a neknominate challenge video

Neknominate, also known as neck and nominate, neknomination or neck nomination, is an online drinking game. The original rules of the game require the participants to film themselves drinking a pint of an alcoholic beverage, usually beer, in one gulp (known as necking) and upload the footage to the web. A participant then nominates another person to do the same within 24 hours.

The game became popular in early 2014, and as it spread it escalated, with nominees performing the challenge in more extreme circumstances, drinking more potent beverages or engaging in dangerous activities either during or immediately after drinking. The British tabloid newspaper Metro reported that at least five deaths in the United Kingdom and Ireland are believed to have been directly linked to the drinking game. One of these was Jonathan Byrne from County Carlow, whose father later appeared on The Late Late Show.

== History ==
Neknominate originated in New Zealand before spreading to the UK and Ireland. The game's popularity has been linked to a video posted to Facebook by Ross Samson, a London Irish rugby player, on 25 December 2013, in which he drinks a bottle of beer and says "I nominate all of you whose birthday it’s not. Merry Christmas." After deaths were linked to the game, Samson distanced himself from it.

An early mention was made of the game on Twitter in 2011, when a British man mentioned playing it with a friend via Skype. In 2013, up until Samson's video, the game was only mentioned 198 times on Twitter; in the two weeks after his video, it was mentioned 1,048 times.

== Criticism ==
The game has been criticised for the danger it poses to participants. Five people are believed to have died as a result of playing the game, including a Cardiff man thought to have downed a pint of vodka, and a London hostel worker who reportedly mixed an entire bottle of white wine with a quarter bottle of whisky, a small bottle of vodka and a can of lager. In the latter case, the victim's nominator was interviewed by police, but it was ruled an accidental death without coercion.

In Ireland, the group Mature Enjoyment of Alcohol in Society expressed concern that posting the videos could "appeal to and be taken up by vulnerable younger drinkers". Alcohol Action Ireland also shared concerns about the game.

== Variants ==
Neknomination in a water slide

In February 2014, a group of South Africans, including Brent Lindeque, adapted the Neknominate game into a challenge to perform random acts of kindness for others. Similar kindness challenges include Feed the Deed in Canada and SmartNominate in France, which encourages participants to donate food to homeless people or give blood. The Ice Bucket Challenge, an activity involving dumping a bucket of ice water on someone's head to promote awareness of the disease amyotrophic lateral sclerosis (also known as Lou Gehrig's disease) and encourage donations to research went viral on social media during July–August 2014. CoppaFeel! ran a ‘Cheknominate’ campaign, a “healthier” take on the Neknominate craze. Cheknominate encouraged people to record themselves checking their breasts for symptoms before nominating a friend to do the same. The Huffington Post was supportive of the campaign, and encouraged its readers to use the hashtag #Cheknominate on social media.

In Italy, the rise of the Neknomination drinking game in 2014 coincided with the name of the popular Italian pop-rock singer Filippo Neviani, known globally by his stage name Nek. This linguistic coincidence led to a unique cultural response aimed at subverting the dangerous nature of the original challenge.

== Development and Impact ==
As the drinking trend gained notoriety for its health risks and associated fatalities in Europe, Italian social media users began a counter-movement. Instead of filming the consumption of large quantities of alcohol, participants used the hashtag #Neknomination to nominate friends to:

- Perform or lip-sync snippets of Nek's hit songs, such as "Laura non c'è" or "Lascia che io sia".
- Share music videos or positive messages related to the artist's discography.

== Significance ==
While the original drinking game remained a significant public health concern among Italian teenagers—with reports indicating high awareness of the binge-drinking version—the musical "Neknomination" served as a form of digital activism. It was one of the earliest examples in the country of using "positive nominations" (SmartNominations) to displace harmful viral content.

This movement helped decouple the artist's brand from the controversial trend and was cited by local media as a creative attempt by fans to promote Italian pop culture over risky social behaviors This movement was cited by local educators as a successful example of using "positive nominations" (often called SmartNominations) to displace harmful viral content among teenagers.

== See also ==
- List of drinking games
- Fire challenge
