= Empathic concern =

Empathic concern refers to other-oriented emotions elicited by, and congruent with the perceived welfare of, someone in need. These other-oriented emotions include feelings of tenderness, sympathy, compassion and soft-heartedness.

Empathic concern is often confused with empathy. To empathize is to respond to another's perceived emotional state by experiencing feeling of a similar sort. Empathic concern or sympathy includes not only empathizing, but also having a positive regard or a non-fleeting concern for the other person.

== Definition ==
C. Daniel Batson, a pioneer of the term, defines it as "other-oriented emotion elicited by and congruent with the perceived welfare of someone in need". Batson explains this definition in the following way:

First, "congruent" here refers not to the specific content of the emotion but to the valence—positive when the perceived welfare of the other is positive, negative when the perceived welfare is negative.… Third, as defined, empathic concern is not a single, discrete emotion but includes a whole constellation. It includes feelings of sympathy, compassion, softheartedness, tenderness, sorrow, sadness, upset, distress, concern, and grief. Fourth, empathic concern is other-oriented in the sense that it involves feeling for the other—feeling sympathy for, compassion for, sorry for, distressed for, concerned for, and so on.

Others use different terms for this construct or very similar constructs. Especially popular—perhaps more popular than "empathic concern"—are sympathy, compassion, or pity. Other terms include the tender emotion and sympathetic distress.

People are strongly motivated to be connected to others. In humans and higher mammals, an impulse to care for offspring is almost certainly genetically hard-wired, although modifiable by circumstance.

== Evolutionary origins ==
At the behavioral level it is evident from the descriptions by comparative psychologists and ethologists that behaviors homologous to empathic concern can be observed in other mammalian species. Notably, a variety of reports on ape empathic reactions suggest that, apart from emotional connectedness, apes have an explicit appreciation of the other's situation. A good example is consolation, defined as reassurance behavior by an uninvolved bystander towards one of the combatants in a previous aggressive incident.

== Developmental origins ==
Empathic concern is thought to emerge later in development and to require more self-control than either emotional contagion or personal distress. Developmental research indicates a broad range of social competencies children bring to their interpersonal relationships. As early as two years of age, children show (a) the cognitive capacity to interpret, in simple ways, the physical and psychological states of others, (b) the emotional capacity to experience, affectively, the state of others, and (c) the behavioral repertoire that permits attempts to alleviate discomfort in others.

Both temperament and social context contribute to individual differences in concern for others. Some developmental psychologists have hypothesized that empathic concern for others is an essential factor inhibiting aggression.

== Contribution of social psychology ==
Empathic concern may produce an altruistic motivation to help people. The challenge of demonstrating the existence of altruistic motivation is to show how empathic concern leads to helping in ways that cannot be explained by prevailing theories of egoistic motivation. That is, a clear case needs to be made that it is concern about the other person's welfare, not a desire to improve one's own welfare, that primarily drives one's helping behavior in a particular situation.

Empirical studies conducted by social psychologist Daniel Batson demonstrate that one feels empathic concern when one adopts the perspective of another person in need. His work emphasizes the different emotions evoked when imagining another situation from a self-perspective or imagining from another perspective. The former is often associated with personal distress (i.e., feelings of discomfort and anxiety), whereas the latter leads to empathic concern.

== Social neuroscience evidence ==
Social neuroscience explores the biological underpinnings of empathic concern (and more generally, interpersonal sensitivity), using an integrative approach that bridges the biological and social levels. Neural systems, including autonomic functions, that rely on brain stem neuropeptides, such as oxytocin and vasopressin, are plausible correlates for empathic concern. Alternatively, vasopressin might be implicated in situations where a more active strategy is required for an effective response.

An association between executive functions, underpinned by the prefrontal cortex with reciprocal connections with the limbic system, the sense of agency, and empathic concern has been suggested based on lesion studies in neurological patients and functional neuroimaging experiments in healthy individuals.

The difference between imagining from one's own perspective and imagining in the shoes or from the perspective of others is supported by a series of functional neuroimaging studies of affective processing. For instance, participants in one study reported more empathic concern when imagining the pain of others when adopting another's perspective, and more personal distress when imagining themselves to be in pain.

fMRI scans revealed that imagining self in pain was associated with strong activation in brain areas involved in affective response to threat and pain, including the amygdala, insula, and anterior cingulate cortex. Imagine-other instructions produced higher activity in the right temporoparietal junction, which is associated with self-other distinctiveness and the sense of agency.

== See also ==
- Affective neuroscience – Study of the neural mechanisms of emotion
- C. Sue Carter – American biologist and behavioral neurobiologist
- Edward O. Wilson – American biologist, naturalist, and writer (1929–2021)
- Empathy-altruism – Form of altruism based on moral emotion
- Frans de Waal – Dutch primatologist and ethologist (1948–2024)
- Jean Decety – American neuroscientist
- Moral emotions – Emotions concerning morality
- Social emotions – Emotions that depend upon other people
- Social neuroscience – Interdisciplinary field in neuroscience
- Stephen Porges – Scientist and professor (born 1945)
- W. D. Hamilton – British evolutionary biologist (1936–2000)
