= Daniel Batson =

American social psychologist (born 1943)

- Born: Charles Daniel Batson; March 15, 1943 (age 83)
- Occupation: Social psychologist

Charles Daniel Batson (born March 15, 1943) is an American social psychologist. He has two doctoral degrees, in theology (from Princeton Theological Seminary) and psychology (from Princeton University's Department of Psychology). Batson obtained his doctorate under John Darley and taught at the University of Kansas. He retired in 2006 and now is an emeritus professor in the psychology department of the University of Tennessee. He is best known for his contributions to the social psychology of altruism, empathic concern, and psychology of religion.

== On altruism ==
Batson has become well known for the empathy-altruism hypothesis, which states that "feeling empathy for [a] person in need evokes motivation to help [that person] in which these benefits to self are not the ultimate goal of helping; they are unintended consequences". The theory, initially proposed as an explanation of the so-called "empathy-helping relationship", implies that pure altruism is possible and that psychological egoism is false. Aronson, Wilson and Akert have described Batson as "the strongest proponent that people often help others purely out of the goodness of their hearts".

Batson has published experimental research to support the empathy-altruism hypothesis against various alternative egoistic explanations. Critics who believe that all apparently altruistic actions are actually egoistic have attacked the theory (see, for example, the competing negative state relief model). More on the empathy-altruism hypothesis can be found in a number of social psychology textbooks, including Brehm and Kassin (1996).

Batson is also the co-author of a study examining bystander intervention in theology students (Darley & Batson, 1973). In this study, students' religious views and personalities did not correlate with their willingness to help a needy bystander. Rather, the best predictor of whether a student would stop to help was how hurried they felt. Since some students were assigned work on the parable of the Good Samaritan, but it had no effect on their behavior, the study has been cited as evidence that exposure to the parable does not make people more helpful. There has been debate about whether Batson used appropriate statistics to analyze this study.

== On empathy ==
Social psychology researchers have for a long time been interested in the distinction between imagining the other and imagining oneself, and in particular in the emotional and motivational consequences of these two perspectives. A number of Batson's studies documented that focusing on another's feelings may evoke stronger empathic concern, while explicitly imagining oneself in the other's situation induces both empathic concern and personal distress.

In one such study, Batson and colleagues investigated the affective consequences of different perspective-taking instructions when participants listened to a story about Katie Banks, a young college student struggling after the death of her parents. This study demonstrated that different instructions had distinct effects on how participants perceived the target's situation. Notably, participants imagining themselves in Katie's place showed stronger signs of discomfort and personal distress than participants focusing on her responses and feelings, or participants instructed to take an objective, detached point of view. Also, both perspective-taking instructions differed from the detached perspective by resulting in higher empathic concern. This may help explain why observing a need situation does not always produce prosocial behavior: if perceiving another person in an emotionally or physically painful circumstance elicits personal distress, the observer may tend not to fully attend to the other's experience and as a result may not behave sympathetically.

Batson recently collaborated with University of Chicago neuroscientist Jean Decety on a study using functional neuroimaging to investigate the neural underpinnings of empathy and personal distress. While being scanned, participants watched a series of video clips of patients undergoing painful medical treatment. They were asked to either put themselves explicitly in the shoes of the patient (imagine self), or to focus on their feelings and affective expressions (imagine other). The behavioral data confirmed that explicitly projecting oneself into an aversive situation leads to higher personal distress whereas focusing on the emotional and behavioral reactions of another's plight yields greater empathic concern and less personal distress.

The neuroimaging data were consistent with this finding and provided insights into the neural correlates of these distinct behavioral responses. The self-perspective evoked stronger hemodynamic responses in brain regions involved in coding the motivational-affective dimensions of pain, including the bilateral insular cortices, the anterior cingulate cortex, the amygdala, and various structures involved in muscle preparation. The amygdala plays a critical role in the evaluation of actual or potential threats. Imagining oneself in a painful and potentially dangerous situation thus may trigger a stronger fearful or aversive response than imagining someone else in the same situation.

== On religion ==
Batson's most famous contribution to psychology of religion is his argument that the traditional distinction made by Gordon Allport between intrinsic and extrinsic religious orientations does not exhaust all possible religious orientations; rather, he believes it is important to refer to what he calls quest, a form of religiosity that views questions and their answers as of equal importance. This view has been controversial, and critics have questioned whether quest really correlates with any other variable relevant to religiosity. Batson has also written about religious experiences, defending a four-stage model based on Graham Wallas's four-stage model of problem-solving in the psychology of creativity.

== Publications ==
- Darley, J.; Batson, C. D. (1973). "From Jerusalem to Jericho: A study of situational and dispositional variables in helping behaviour". Journal of Personality and Social Psychology. 27: 100–108. doi:10.1037/h0034449.
- Batson, C. D. (1976). "Religion as prosocial: Agent or double agent?". Journal for the Scientific Study of Religion. 15: 29–45.
- Batson, C. D. (1991). The Altruism Question: Toward a Social-Psychological Answer, Hillsdale, NJ: Erlbaum.
- Batson, C. D.; Schoenrade, P. (1991). "Measuring Religion as Quest: 1) Validity concerns". Journal for the Scientific Study of Religion. 30 (4): 416–429. doi:10.2307/1387277. JSTOR 1387277.
- Batson, C. D.; Schoenrade, P. (1991). "Measuring Religion as Quest: 2) Reliability Concerns". Journal for the Scientific Study of Religion. 30 (4): 430–437. doi:10.2307/1387278. JSTOR 1387278.
- Batson, C. D.; Shaw, L. L. (1991). "Evidence for Altruism: Toward a Pluralism of Prosocial Motives". Psychological Inquiry. 2 (2): 107–122. doi:10.1207/s15327965pli0202_1. JSTOR 1449242.
- Batson, C. D., Schoenrade, P. & Ventis, L. (1993). Religion and the Individual. New York: Oxford University Press.
- Batson, C. D., Schoenrade, P. & Ventis. L. W. (1993). Religion and the Individual. New York. Cambridge University Press
- Batson, C. D. (2009). "These things called empathy: eight related but distinct phenomena". In J. Decety & W. Ickes (Eds.), The Social Neuroscience of Empathy (pp. 3–15). Cambridge: MIT Press.
- Batson, C. D. (2009). "Two forms of perspective taking: imagining how another feels and imagining how you would feel". In K. D. Markman, W. M. P. Klein and J. A. Suhr (Eds.), Handbook of Imagination and Mental Simulation (pp. 267–279). New York: Psychology Press.
- Batson, C. D. (2011). Altruism in Humans. New York: Oxford University Press.

== See also ==
- Social cognition
- Social neuroscience
