= Kindness Week (Canada) =

Annual observance in Canada

Kindness Week is celebrated in Canada every year during the third week of February. A bill to this effect Kindness Week Act (S.C. 2021, c. 9) was enacted in Canada on June 3, 2021.

The purpose of the week is given as "to improve the health and well-being of Canadians by encouraging acts of kindness, volunteering, and charitable giving.” The statute mentions kindness can encourage such values as empathy, respect, gratitude and compassion and also that it can improve the health and well-being of citizens, in the preamble.

Canada is the first country to pass such legislation. Senator from Ontario Jim Munson had spearheaded the efforts to get the legislation passed.

== See also ==
- Wall of kindness
