= The Kindness of Strangers =

The Kindness of Strangers may refer to:

== Plays ==
- "I have always depended on the kindness of strangers", a line from Tennessee Williams' A Streetcar Named Desire (1947)

== TV and films ==
- "The Kindness of Strangers" (Heroes), an episode of the television show Heroes
- "The Kindness of Strangers", an episode of BBC's Merlin
- The Kindness of Strangers, a 1998 film by Tony Palmer about André Previn
- The Kindness of Strangers a 2006 UK television film drama starring Julie Graham
- The Kindness of Strangers (film), a 2019 drama film

== Music ==
- The Kindness of Strangers (album), an album by Spock's Beard
- "The Kindness of Strangers", a song by Nick Cave and the Bad Seeds featured on the album Murder Ballads
- "Kindness of Strangers", a song by The American Analog Set featured on the album Know by Heart

== Books ==
- The Kindness of Strangers, a 1969 memoir by Salka Viertel
- The Kindness of Strangers, a 1985 biography of Tennessee Williams by Donald Spoto
- The Kindness of Strangers: Child Abandonment in Western Europe from Late Antiquity to the Renaissance, a 1988 book by John Boswell
- The Kindness of Strangers, a 2002 autobiography by Kate Adie
- The Kindness of Strangers, a 2006 novel by Katrina Kittle
- The Kindness of Strangers, a 2021 book of travel narratives by Tom Lutz

== See also ==
- The Comfort of Strangers, a 1981 novel by Ian McEwan
- The Kindness Offensive, a group practicing random acts of kindness for the general public
