= Feed the Deed =

Charity initiative

Feed The Deed, also known as #FeedtheDeed, is a social media pay-it-forward initiative that started in February 2014. Participants film themselves performing a creative random act of kindness, then nominate friends and family to continue on the chain. The participant usually uploads a video or pictures of the kind act to Facebook, then will tag four or five friends in the post. The nominated person is generally told to complete the task within 24 hours.

Since this initiative was started, over 10,000 #FeedtheDeed posts have been uploaded to various forms of social media. The trend is most popular in Canada, United States, United Kingdom, Australia, and Mexico, but has since spread to over 30 countries. The act of kindness can be anything – from donating food and clothes to the homeless, to giving blood.

== History ==
Feed The Deed originated as a response to the Neknominate drinking game, in which participants film themselves drinking alcohol then nominate friends to do the same.

Josh Stern, a medical student at the University of Ottawa, posted his original #FeedtheDeed video to his Facebook page. He was then contacted by his friend Russell Citron, who is president and founder of the non-profit organization Kindness Counts. The two decided to collaborate on the project by taking Stern's #FeedtheDeed moniker and running it through Citron's organization Kindness Counts.

Stern says that the inspiration for #FeedtheDeed came from a YouTube video in which Brent Lindeque decided to use his neknomination to give food to a homeless man instead of drinking alcohol. Lindeque is currently running a similar campaign in South Africa called #ChangeOneThing.

Feed the Deed has been run through the "Kindness Counts" Facebook page.

== See also ==
- Altruism
- Charity (practice)
- Charitable organization
- Effective altruism
- Empathy-altruism
- Free Money Day
- Ice Bucket Challenge
- List of awards for volunteerism and community service
- Mitzvah
- Parable of the Good Samaritan
- Philanthropy
- The Sheep and the Goats
- Suspended coffee
- Random Acts of Kindness Day
- Volunteerism
