= Kindness =

Type of behaviour

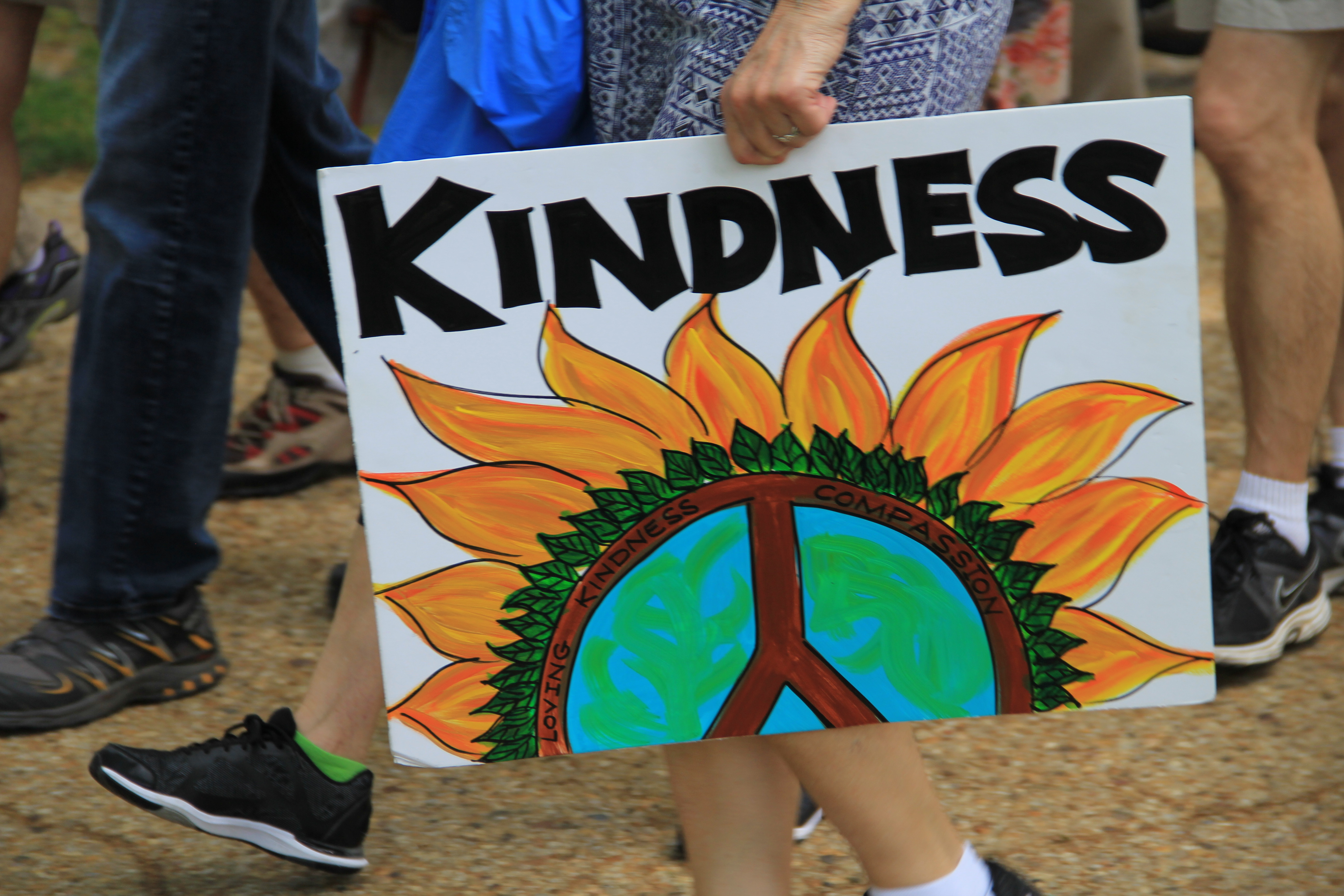
Placard for kindness, at the People's Climate March (2017)

Kindness is a type of behavior marked by acts of generosity, consideration, or concern for others, without expecting praise or reward in return. It is a subject of interest in philosophy, religion, and psychology.

It can be directed towards one's self, other people or a broader community/organisation, and is present across multiple different species and cultures.

== History ==
In English, the word kindness dates from approximately 1300, though the word's sense evolved to its current meanings in the late 14th century. The word "kindness" comes from the Old English "kyndnes", which is related to "kind", meaning "nature" or "family", or "love". This suggests that kindness was initially seen as a natural quality within one's kin.

== In ancient philosophy ==
There are discussions of kindness in both Western and Eastern philosophical traditions.

In “Rhetoric II Chapter 7”, Aristotle defines kindness (charis) as “helpfulness towards someone in need”. He focuses his discussion on the needs of the person helped. Kindness is great if it is shown toward “someone in great need, or in need of what is important or what is difficult to get, or someone who has need in a crisis, or if the helper is the only one or first one”. Also, the service should be non-transactional and rendered freely without the consideration of personal gain (“not in return for anything, nor for the advantage of the helper himself”). He emphasises the importance of action when showing kindness (“service”), but does not comment on feelings of pain or pleasure of the person acting in kindness. In other words, a person may think that it is right and proper to stand by others who are in need, but this does not have to be accompanied by any emotions. Furthermore, Aristotle seems to hold the view that when acting out of kindness, sympathy goes out to an individual because of the circumstances the individual happens to be in, and not because of who the specific individual happens to be. Kindness is offered for the sake of the beneficiary, whether or not one has an attachment to him. This kind of anonymity in one’s response distinguishes it from friendship - when a person acts out of a specific concern for a particular person.

Ren, a central concept of Confucius’ moral philosophy, is interpreted by scholars as shared humanity or kindness for others. The term suggests a deep interconnectedness among people and embodies the belief that each person is part of a wider human community that should be treated with shared kindness. To Confucius, ren was the foundation from which all human virtue grew. It also starts with kindness towards one's family, as goodwill shown at home will transform into compassion in the community and the world. In “Analects”, Confucius discusses the tension between two key virtues - kindness and righteousness (yi). When asked whether hatred should be repaid with kindness, he replied "And what will you repay kindness with? Rather repay hatred with justice, and kindness with kindness." While one should not deliberately seek vengeance out of momentary anger, nor should one conceal resentment over a grudge and repay it with kindness. This suggests that mature morality requires knowing when to apply which virtue. The "Records of Ritual" distinguishes between the domains of these two virtues, suggesting that in regulating one’s household, kindness overrules righteousness, while outside of one’s house, righteousness cuts off kindness.

== In modern philosophy ==
While some definitions of kindness focus on emotional warmth or good-natured impulses, Immanuel Kant disagreed with the idea that feeling kind was enough to make an action moral. Across his works, he distinguishes between pathological love (as inclination) and practical love (from duty). In “Groundwork of the Metaphysics of Morals”, Kant suggests that an act possesses moral worth only when it is practiced as a conscious, rational commitment rather than a fleeting feeling. For Kant, being kind-hearted is different from having a will governed by moral principle. True moral kindness stems from a good will and occurs when you help someone because it is the right thing to do, even when you don't feel like doing it. In addition, Kant emphasizes that we must treat others always as ends in themselves and never merely as a means to an end. In the context of kindness, this implies that one should not be kind merely to achieve one’s own goals, but rather as a rational recognition of the inherent dignity and value of the other person.

Friedrich Nietzsche offers a critique of this perspective that kindness is a rational obligation that honors the dignity of all humans. For Nietzsche, kindness is not a neutral or universal good and should therefore be practiced cautiously. He identifies kindness and sympathy as central virtues of a slave-morality that originates among the oppressed and those uncertain of themselves. He argued that a morality centered on alleviating all suffering (the idea of mitleid - pity or compassion or sympathy) is a denial of life. He advocated instead for people to strive towards a master-morality that values excellence and the endeavour to become great and strong by overcoming obstacles and challenges. Nietzsche suggests that when kindness is taken to the extreme, it robs our finitude of significance because it fails to recognize the ennobling aspects of suffering. By trying to eliminate pain, kindness may inadvertently stifle the striving and greatness that suffering can produce.

== In religion ==
Kindness is an important teaching in the three Abrahamic religions, Judaism, Christianity, and Islam. Although each tradition approaches kindness from different perspectives, they all emphasize that treating others with compassion and helping those in need are important values.

Being kind and doing good to others is a tenet of Islam, and the Quran recommends to practice kindness as a way to attain serenity and tranquillity of the soul. “Surah 2 Al-Baqara, Ayah 263” states that “Kind words and forgiveness are better than charity followed by injury”. Treating others with kindness is more important than giving money and then reminding others of the favour with hurtful or mocking words, as the latter actions can nullify the reward of the charity. Kindness towards parents, spouses, neighbours and orphans are repeatedly mentioned in the Quran, but notably, Islam encourages Muslims to show kindness even towards enemies and oppressors. Prophet Muhammad displayed kindness to his enemies, hoping to heal rifts through compassion and understanding. When his enemies came to the Ka’bah during the conquest of Mecca, he said to his former adversaries, “I say to you as Yusuf said to his brothers: No blame upon you today. Allah will forgive you, for he is the most merciful of the merciful.” In addition to kindness towards people, Islam also teaches one to be kind to animals, as they are also creations of Allah and deserving of care. “Surah Al-An’am, ayah 38” states that “All the creatures that crawl on the earth and those that fly with their wings are communities like yourselves.”

In Hinduism, the practice of kindness is a spiritual necessity rooted in the theological understanding of monism (seeing all life as one). This sense of universal interconnectedness drives the foundational principle of ahimsa (non-violence), which mandates harmlessness in thought, word, and deed toward all sentient beings, and can be expressed through various ways such as vegetarianism, environmental protection, or caring for the vulnerable. Practicing kindness is also intrinsically tied to the idea of good karma, where selfless acts of dana (giving) and sewa (selfless service) serve to purify the soul and accumulate positive merit. By performing these services, an individual fulfills their righteous obligations while undergoing an internal transformation toward spiritual enlightenment.

== In psychology ==
From the perspective of developmental and positive psychology, kindness has been considered a state of being that reflects inner emotions and attitudes, and is manifested in behaviors and dispositions in the way one relates to others and oneself. It is a multidimensional construct that developmentally evolves, shaped by cognitive development, personal and interpersonal factors and social contexts. As individuals mature across childhood and adolescence, their understanding and expression of kindness become more complex, reflecting growing social and relational awareness and competency.

A kindness model has been proposed that distinguishes between three core components of kindness: 1) kind emotions, 2) kind cognitions, and 3) kind behaviors. Each of these components can be other-oriented or self-oriented. Kind emotions refer to emotions of sympathy, empathy, and respect (other-oriented), or feelings of ethical guilt over wrongdoing or pride after acting in line with one’s ideals and ethical principles (self-oriented). Kind cognitions reflect an active process of understanding and integrating others’ perspectives into one’s own. Self-reflection is also essential to appreciate the relativity of every standpoint and synthesize various perspectives, which ultimately broadens the mind’s range and openness for new experiences. Both kind emotions and cognitions require mindfulness – the ability to observe and be aware of one’s own emotional states and thoughts as they relate to interactions with others. Kind actions that are other-oriented include simple acts of helping or comforting another person, or more complex prosocial behaviours such as sharing with or being inclusive of discriminated people. Self-oriented kind actions include self-caring behaviours. The more each of these components are learnt and practiced as part of everyday life, the more power they will have to transform the self.

Research suggests that kindness has both hedonic and eudaimonic benefits for an individual. Humans are a prosocial species, and while prosocial behavior is enacted to benefit others, several studies have shown that doing so improves the wellbeing of the actor in addition to its intended recipient. Acting in a prosocial manner feels good, and the hedonic rewards of doing so suggest a potential mechanism for how kindness may be encouraged and maintained. Adults who spend time volunteering report lower levels of depression and greater happiness than non-volunteers. In an experiment, consumers who spent money on someone else were happier than those instructed to spend money on themselves, regardless of the value spent. In another experiment, researchers randomly assigned employees at a workplace to either be performers or recipients of random acts of kindness. Multiple measures of wellbeing improved in both groups, and givers reported weaker depressive symptoms and increased satisfaction with both their jobs and their lives. Prosociality may have eudaimonic rewards as well, as it has been shown to satisfy key psychological needs of the actor such as autonomy, competence, and relatedness. In one study investigating the proximal and momentary experience of kindness, participants assigned to do kind acts for others reported a greater sense of competence, self-confidence, and meaning while engaging in those acts. Other experiments have shown that being prosocial may lead people to feel more competent, more in control, and more connected.

Studies at Yale University used games with babies to conclude that kindness is inherent to human beings. There are similar studies about the root of empathy in infancy – with motor mirroring developing in the early months of life, and leading (optimally) to the concern shown by children for their peers in distress.

Barbara Taylor and Adam Phillips stressed the element of necessary realism in adult kindness, as well as the way "real kindness changes people in the doing of it, often in unpredictable ways". Polite fiction and paternalistic deception can backfire.

Although kindness is generally associated with positive psychological effects, its benefits may depend on the circumstances. Studies have found that people who feel obligated to help others may experience more negative emotions than those who help voluntarily. Researchers have also examined prosocial burnout during periods of prolonged stress, including the COVID-19 pandemic. Other studies may suggest that consistently sacrificing personal needs for someone else can negatively affect the individuals well-being. Collectively, these findings show that kindness may be beneficial when freely chosen but associated with negative outcomes when it becomes an obligation that involves emotional strain or personal sacrifice.

== In education ==
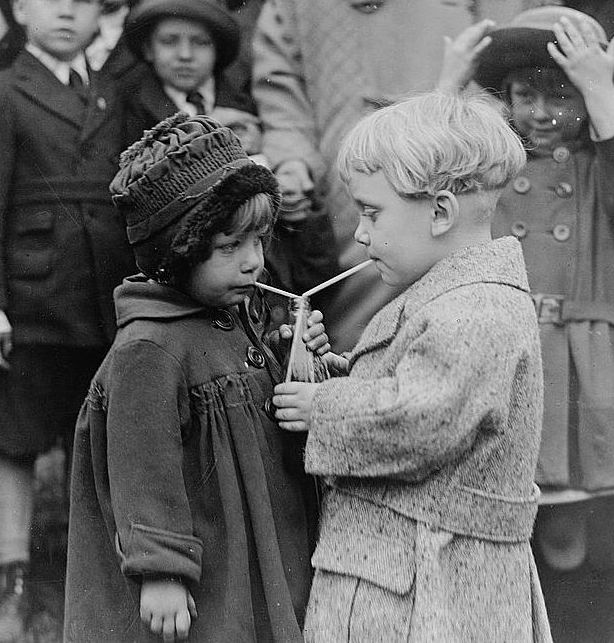
Two children sharing a soft drink at the White House, 1922.

Kindness is most often taught by parents to children and is learned through observation and some direct teaching. Studies have shown that through programs and interventions kindness can be taught and encouraged during the first 20 years of life. Further studies show that kindness interventions can help improve well-being with comparable results as teaching gratitude. Similar findings have shown that organizational level teaching of kindness can improve the well-being of adults in college.

Schools flourish when its community is built upon norms of virtuous behavior – including kindness. Many schools around the world list kindness as a core pillar of their educational mission. Examples include Brighton College, Newton Prep UK, United World College (South East Asia) and International School of Switzerland. It has been suggested that usage of the term kindness is prevalent in schools due to its relatability and accessibility for children. A social-cognitive approach to virtue emphasizes the importance of having a set of accessible mental representations (schemas) for expressing virtues. As revealed in a study with 4^{th} and 5^{th} graders, generosity, compassion and inclusion were most accessible and central to children’s kindness schemas, and may be ideal launching points for interventions. In contrast, scaffolding may be required when introducing more complex ideas of civility and gratitude as forms of kindness.

There is merit in further studying the development of kindness schemas during adolescence. In a study exploring how high school students conceptualized kindness in schools, a sizeable proportion of students defined kindness in a generic manner lacking in detail, and these vague responses suggested either a lack of interest or insufficient understanding of the concept. The modeling of prosocial behavior by adults in the school is an important pathway through which similar actions can be encouraged in students. Positive relationships with peers and teachers also serve as sites for the practice and cultivation of kindness. When high school students responded to why they might be reluctant to be kind, six notable themes emerged – popularity, negative influences, stigma/fear, poor treatment from others, family/home life problems and negative mood or mental health.

A framework of “kind discipline” has been suggested as an alternative way to support students who misbehave and challenges educators to rethink their own beliefs around how to be kind at school. This approach shifts away from punitive systems and is grounded in fostering intrinsic motivation and positive relationships in schools.

The school curriculum can also be leveraged on to foster kindness. Educators can advocate for and include kindness-themed literature and class assignments that encourage students to reflect upon and enact kindness to others in the school or wider community.

== In literature ==
Kindness can be explicitly and implicitly developed through sharing and discussing stories presented in children’s literature. Readers of fiction tend to have better abilities of empathy and theory of mind. Psychologists at the New School for Social Research in New York, conducted a series of experiments to show that reading literary fiction enhances the ability to detect and understand other people's emotions. In 1990, Dr. Rudine Sims Bishop coined the term “Windows, Mirrors and Sliding Glass Doors” to explain how children see themselves in books and how they can also learn about the lives of others through literature. Diverse stories provide children a window to feel someone else’s emotions or experience, and potentially opens them up to raw feelings of compassion for those who have been othered. R. J. Palacio’s 2012 novel Wonder follows a boy with facial deformity entering a mainstream school and uses multiple perspectives to show how kindness affects an entire community. Its central message that choosing kindness inspires a chain reaction of good will toward others resonated globally across all ages and started the “Choose Kind” movement.

== In society ==
Human mate choice studies suggest that both men and women value kindness in their prospective mates, along with intelligence, physical appearance, attractiveness, and age.

The New Zealand the Prime Minister Jacinda Ardern believed that leadership should espouse kindness when she led the country through the COVID-19 pandemic, the Christchurch mosque shootings, and the Whakaari volcanic eruption.

== See also ==
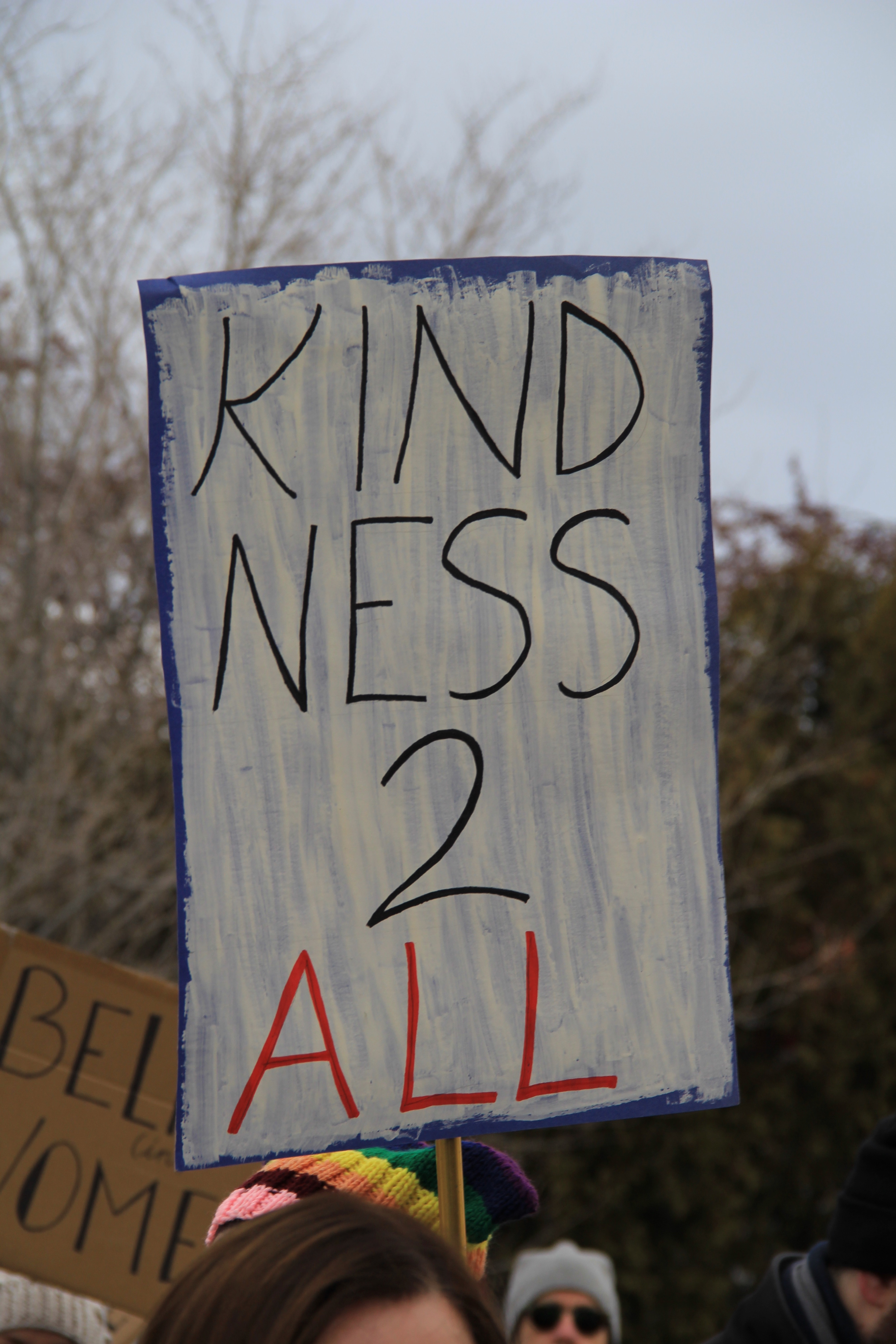
2018 Women's March in Missoula, Montana

- Altruism – Concern for the well-being of others
- Be Kind to Humankind Week
- Compassion – Movement or motivation to help others
- Empathy – Ability to understand or feel what another is feeling
- Generosity – Liberality in giving
- Good – Concept in ethics, religion, and philosophy
- Good faith – Intention to be fair, open, and honest
- Moral character – Steady moral qualities in people
- Moral emotions – Emotions concerning morality
- Reciprocity – Repayment in kind
- Pay it forward – Expression for describing the beneficiary of a good deed repaying the kindness to others
- Random act of kindness – Unpremeditated act to cheer up another
- Random Acts of Kindness Day – Day to celebrate kindness
- r/K selection theory – Evolutionary hypothesis
- The Kindness Offensive – North London group known for random acts of kindness
- World Kindness Day – International observance on 13 November
- Greatness – Concept of superiority
- Kindness Week (Canada)
