= Wall of kindness =

Charitable practice

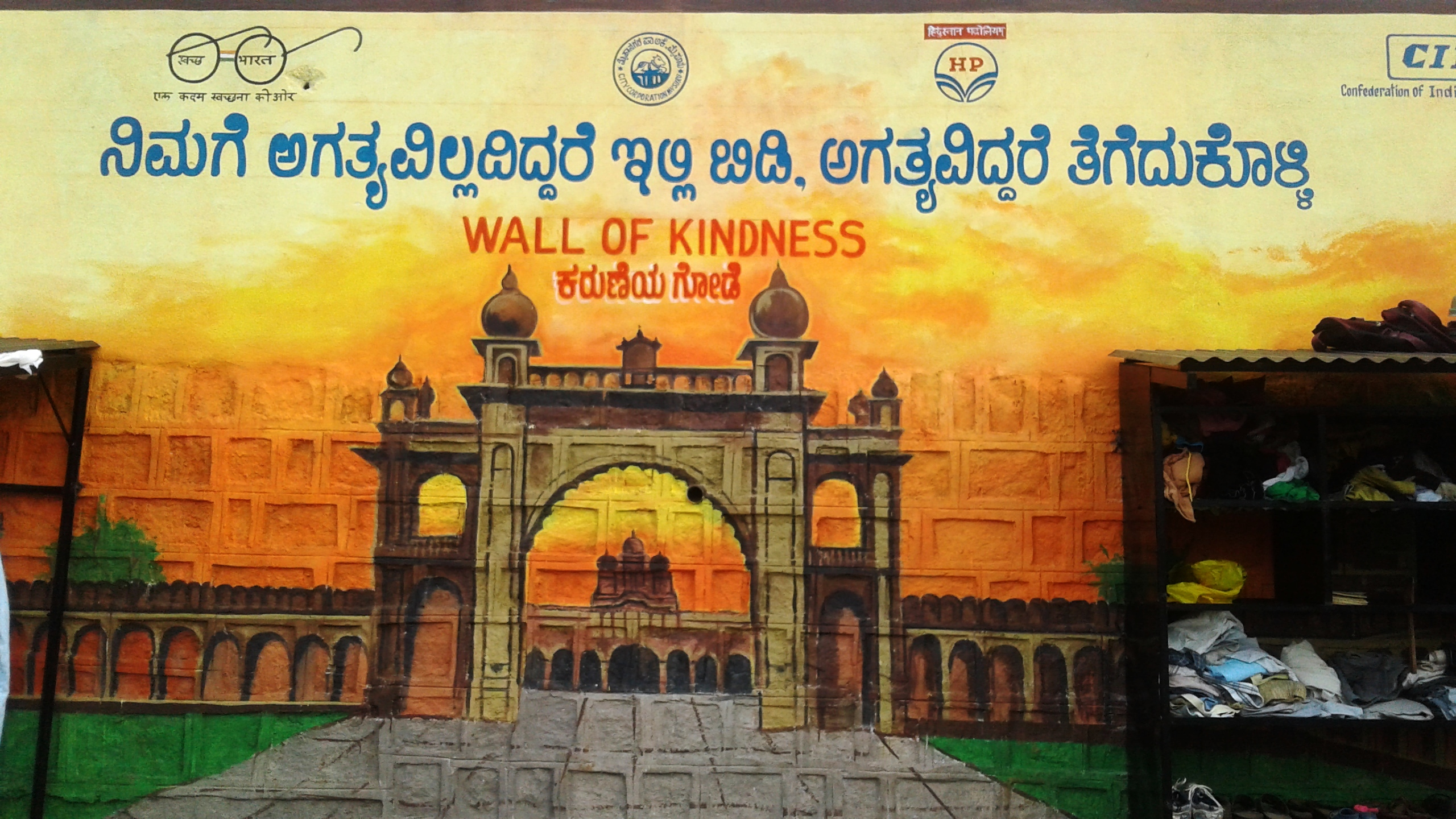
Wall of kindness, Mysore, India

A wall of kindness (Persian: دیوار مهربانی dīvār-e mehrabānī; Urdu: دیوار مہربانی Dewar e meherbani) is a charity work phenomenon and a kind of welfare, usually done by attaching cloth hangers from outside of houses; those encourage people to donate miscellaneous useful things such as winter clothing. It was introduced by an anonymous Iranian, and the practice quickly spread throughout the country. The motto of the movement are two sentences that appear on the walls: "Leave what you don't need" (نیاز نداری بگذار) and "Take what you do" (نیاز داری بردار).

== Description ==
Initially started for the homeless people of Mashhad, Iran, the act is intended to support those in need. In response to social media, large numbers of people are taking part in this campaign, and it has helped many homeless or otherwise destitute people during the cold winter weather.

A similar initiative, but with open fridges, spread from Tehran to other cities. Additionally, bookshelves are being added to the walls of kindness in order to donate books for poor children.

A wall of kindness was seen in Pakistan's Karachi on 15 January 2016, and another one appeared in China's Liuzhou, located in the Guangxi Zhuang Autonomous Region on 29 January 2016. Moreover, students of Marymount International School of Rome, in April 2016, reproduced the idea by designating a wall with a similar function and name. In Peshawar, a wall of kindness was set up by Serve Mankind & Wadaan and later started spreading all over Pakistan. Cities like Rawalpindi, Lahore, Sialkot, Quetta, Khuzdar, and Karachi have also witnessed similar walls, where people leave clothes and other essential items for the poor. Another good endeavor in this cause is seen where a website (dewaremeherbani.com) of Walls of Kindness has been developed by two volunteers to give it a digital footprint. At initial stage, a comprehensive list of such walls across Pakistan is provided there along with their actual locations on google map for easy accessibility. We hope that such locations in other countries would also be mapped at this website in future.

A new Wall of Kindness was recently witnessed in Amman/Jordan at the Landmark Amman Hotel on 21 November 2017. This marked the first day of rain, inviting generous souls, including children, to donate clothes anonymously for those in need ahead of the winter season. After receiving donations, the hotel's laundry team picks up the clothes, cleans them, irons them, wraps them up, and hangs them back, making them available for the recipients just like brand new items.

Similar walls known as "Neki ki Deewar" have sprung up in multiple cities across India, such as Allahabad, Bhilwara, Jhalawar, Mysore, Chandigarh, Bhopal, Dehradun, Korba, and Kolkata. Sometimes, these walls even have more supply than demand of clothes. Additionally, these walls serve the unexpected purpose of keeping walls clean and free from spitting.

== Background ==
The economy of Iran took a hit when sanctions were imposed by the Western World. As the situation worsened, with an increasing number of unemployed individuals, many could not afford clothes. Inflation caused particular difficulties for those in need. In the winter of 2015, young Iranians in Vahid came up with an idea. The main theme was to meet the demand for resources from charities. For the first time, a wall symbolized unity rather than separation, and the community was asked to donate voluntarily. As soon as the attempt caught the attention of various social and mass media platforms, it was supported and praised by citizens as well as netizens.

Young Iranians took the chance to strengthen the bonds of their community. The campaign went smoothly despite the risk of misuse and loss of resources. People were responsive and aware that the most vulnerable should take priority.

Winter clothing was distributed among a mass number of people as welfare had been seen before.

== See also ==
- Charity (practice)
- Empathy
- Empathy-altruism
- Mutual aid
- Prosocial behavior
- Random act of kindness
- Social psychology
- Take a penny, leave a penny
