= Free Money =

Free Money may refer to:

- Free Money (film), a 1998 Canadian film
- "Free Money" (song), a 1975 song by Patti Smith
- Free Money Day, a global social experiment held annually on 15 September whereby participants hand out money to strangers, asking them to pass half on to someone else
- Freigeld (German for Free Money), a monetary unit proposed by German economist Silvio Gesell
- The term "free money" has been used to describe a universal basic income
- Handouts
