= Brent Lindeque =

Author, podcaster and public speaker in South Africa

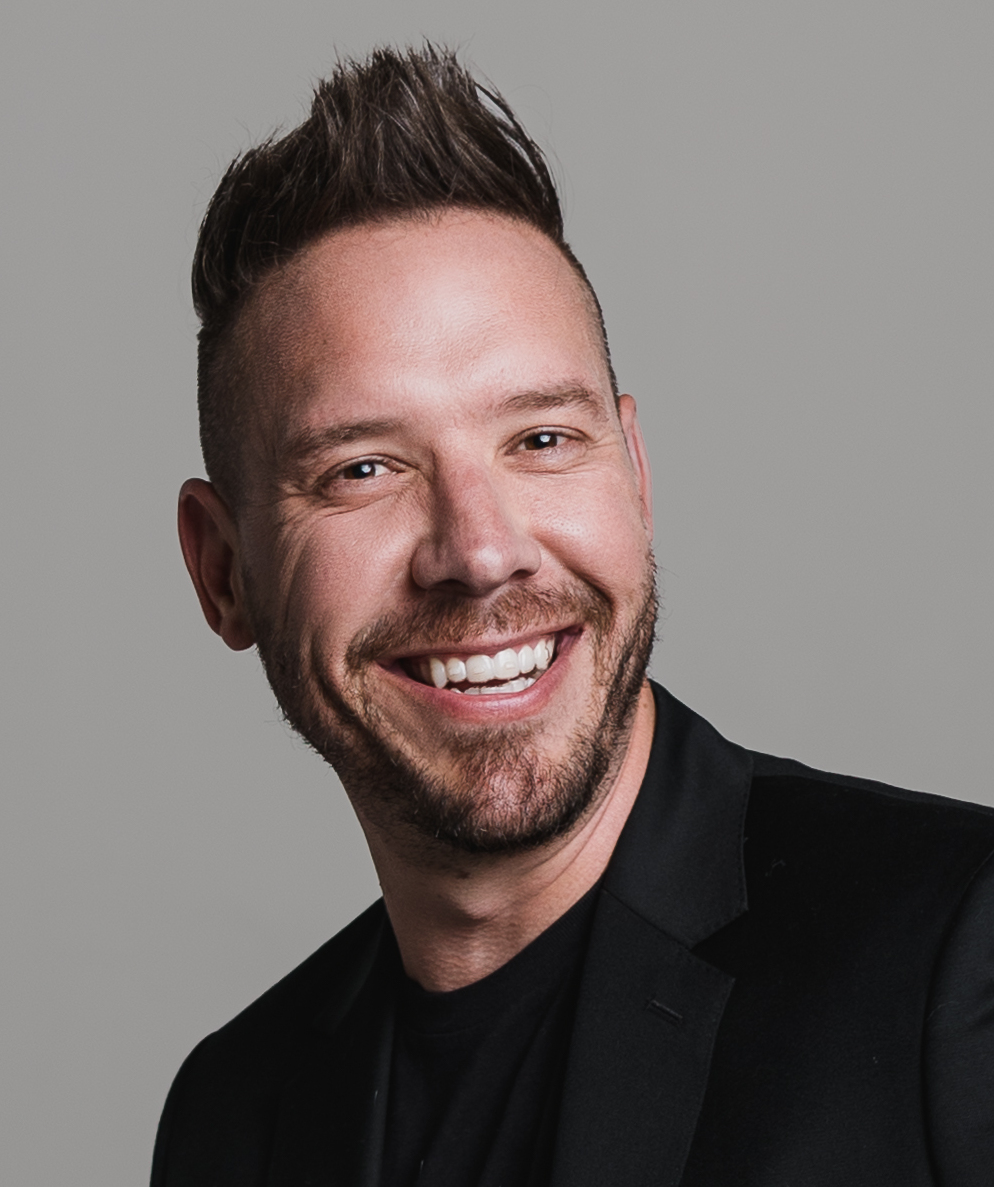
- Lindeque in 2023
- Born: January 16, 1985 (age 41)
- Other name: Good Things Guy
- Education: IMM Graduate School
- Occupation: Entrepreneur • Journalist • Author • Podcaster • Public speaker

Brent Lindeque (born 16 January 1985) is a South African entrepreneur, journalist, author, podcaster, and public speaker. He authored the book Only Good Things and serves as the editor of Good Things Guy, a digital platform he founded that focuses on disseminating positive news stories. He is also referred to as the Good Things Guy.

== Early life and education ==
Lindeque was born and raised in Johannesburg, South Africa, attended Marais Viljoen High School and pursued a degree in marketing and successfully completed two of the three-year program at IMM Graduate School.

== NekNomination ==
Lindeque initiated the South African version of the international social media trend NekNomination, which became known locally as RakNomination (Random Acts of Kindness). This adaptation replaced the original drinking challenge with a call to perform acts of kindness. One of the campaigns associated with the initiative raised over US$4,000 in support of 14 orphans that also inspired the Feed the Deed initiative in Canada led by Josh Stern. Brent's movement was covered by CNN in South Africa. Following this, he established a digital news platform focused on positive news stories in South Africa.

== Personal life ==
Lindeque is openly gay and has been together with his partner, Andrew, since 2009. He advocates for gay rights in South Africa. He also faced cyberbullying from a random online cyberstalker that required law intervention to uncover and led to a successful prosecution. He also advocated for positive coverage of Nelson Mandela during his final years.
