= Pay it forward =

Expression for describing the beneficiary of a good deed repaying the kindness to others

Pay it forward is an expression for describing the beneficiary of a good deed repaying the kindness to others rather than paying it back to the original benefactor. It is also called serial reciprocity.

The concept is old, but the particular phrase may have been coined by Lily Hardy Hammond in her 1916 book In the Garden of Delight. Robert Heinlein's 1951 novel Between Planets helped popularize the phrase.

"Pay it forward" is implemented in contract law of loans in the concept of third party beneficiaries. Specifically, the creditor offers the debtor the option of paying the debt forward by lending it to a third person instead of paying it back to the original creditor. This contract may include the provision that the debtor may repay the debt in kind, lending the same amount to a similarly disadvantaged party once they have the means, and under the same conditions. Debt and payments can be monetary or by good deeds. A related type of transaction, which starts with a gift instead of a loan, is alternative giving.

== History ==
Paying forward was used as a key plot element in the denouement of a New Comedy prizewinning play by Menander, Dyskolos (roughly translated as "The Grouch") that debuted in 317 BC in Athens.

A basic pattern of this concept is the inter-generational devotion of parents to their children, re-enacting what their own parents did for them. In her 1916 book In the Garden of Delight, Lily Hardy Hammond reflects, "I never repaid Great-aunt Letitia's love to her, any more than she repaid her mother's. You don't pay love back; you pay it forward."

The concept is featured in the short story "The Boy Scout" by American author and former war correspondent Richard Harding Davis, published in The Metropolitan Magazine (March 1914). In it, a young boy scout performs a good deed that eventually reverberates worldwide.

Regarding money, the concept was described by Benjamin Franklin, in a letter to Benjamin Webb dated April 25, 1784:

I do not pretend to give such a deed; I only lend it to you. When you [...] meet with another honest Man in similar Distress, you must pay me by lending this Sum to him; enjoining him to discharge the Debt by a like operation, when he shall be able, and shall meet with another opportunity. I hope it may thus go thro' many hands, before it meets with a Knave that will stop its Progress. This is a trick of mine for doing a deal of good with a little money.

The Bible mentions a similar tenet. In Ecclesiastes 11:1 has one example: "Cast your bread upon the waters, for you will find it after many days." At Matthew 18:21–35, Jesus indicates that paying it forward is a requirement for those who have received God's forgiveness. He presents the parable of a man who had been forgiven a huge debt by the king, because the debtor had begged for mercy. However, after being freed from the debt, he found a fellow who owed him a very small debt, by comparison. Although he had been shown a great mercy, he refused the same consideration to his fellow who had pled for more time to pay. When the king learned this, he was angry and threw the original debtor into prison until he paid the entire debt. Jesus concluded the story: "So likewise shall my heavenly Father do also unto you, if ye from your hearts forgive not every one his brother their trespasses."

Ralph Waldo Emerson, in his 1841 essay "Compensation", wrote: "In the order of nature we cannot render benefits to those from whom we receive them, or only seldom. But the benefit we receive must be rendered again, line for line, deed for deed, cent for cent, to somebody." Football coach Woody Hayes (1913–1987), whose Ohio State University teams won five national titles, misquoted Emerson as "You can pay back only seldom. You can always pay forward, and you must pay line for line, deed for deed, and cent for cent." He also shortened the (mis)quotation into "You can never pay back; but you can always pay forward" and variants.

The 1929 novel, Magnificent Obsession, by Lloyd C. Douglas, also espoused this philosophy, in combination with the concept that good deeds should be performed in confidence.

An anonymous spokesman for Alcoholics Anonymous said in The Christian Science Monitor in 1944, "You can't pay anyone back for what has happened to you, so you try to find someone you can pay forward."

Also in 1944, the first steps were taken in the development of what became the Heifer Project, one of whose core strategies is "Passing on the Gift".

In Robert Heinlein's 1951 novel Between Planets, the circumstances of war place the protagonist in a country where it is illegal to spend his foreign money. He is hungry and a stranger gives him enough to pay for lunch:

The banker reached into the folds of his gown, pulled out a single credit note. "But eat first—a full belly steadies the judgment. Do me the honor of accepting this as our welcome to the newcomer."

His pride said no; his stomach said YES! Don took it and said, "Uh, thanks! That's awfully kind of you. I'll pay it back, first chance."

"Instead, pay it forward to some other brother who needs it."

The mathematician Paul Erdős heard about a promising math student unable to enroll in Harvard University for financial reasons. Erdős contributed enough to allow the young man to register. Years later, the man offered to return the entire amount to Erdős, but Erdős insisted that the man rather find another student in his situation, and give the money to him.

It is also possible for the original beneficiary to become part of the later chain of kindness. Some time in 1980, a sixteen-page supplemental Marvel comic appeared in the Chicago Tribune entitled “What Price a Life?” and was subsequently reprinted as the backup story in Marvel Team-Up #126 dated February 1983. This was a team-up between Spider-Man and The Incredible Hulk, in which Spider-Man helps the Hulk escape from police who mistakenly thought that he was attacking them. Afterwards, they meet in their secret identities, with Peter Parker warning Bruce Banner to leave town because of the Hulk's seeming attack on police. But Banner is flat broke, and cannot afford even bus fare. As a result, Parker gives Banner his last $5 bill, saying that someone had given him money when he was down on his luck, and this was how he was repaying that debt. Later, in Chicago, the Hulk confronts muggers who had just robbed an elderly retired man of his pension money, all the money he had. After corralling the muggers, the Hulk turns towards the victim. The retiree thinks that the Hulk is about to attack him as well, but instead, the Hulk gives him the $5 bill. It transpires that the very same old man had earlier given a down-on-his-luck Peter Parker a $5 bill.

"Pay it Forward Chains" in fast food stores has become somewhat common, where people pay for the drink or food items in front of them. Starbucks, for example, frequently has long chains, including one of 378 customers at a Florida Starbucks. There has, however, been some controversy around them, as Baristas who experience them complain about mixed up orders while other customers have found themselves stuck with significantly larger payments than the cost of their food and potential confrontations as a result. The concept of setting up a "Pay It Forward chain" in order to profit from a massive order was lampooned in an episode of the Netflix series, I Think You Should Leave with Tim Robinson. This resulted in an internet meme based on the order he placed, "55 Burgers, 55 Fries, 55 Tacos, 55 Pies, 55 Cokes, 100 Tater Tots, 100 Pizzas, 100 Chicken Tenders, 100 Meatballs, 100 Coffees, 55 Wings, 55 Shakes, 55 Pancakes, 55 Pastas, 55 Peppers, and 155 Taters, totaling $680" which was sold on its own t-shirt.

== 1999 novel, film and subsequent projects ==
In 1999, Catherine Ryan Hyde's novel Pay It Forward was published and then adapted in 2000 into a film of the same name, distributed by Warner Bros. and starring Kevin Spacey, Helen Hunt and Haley Joel Osment. In Ryan Hyde's book and movie, it is described as an obligation to do three good deeds for others in response to a good deed that one receives. Such good deeds should accomplish things that the other person cannot accomplish on their own. In this way, the practice of helping one another can spread geometrically through society, at a ratio of three to one, creating a social movement with an impact of making the world a better place.

The Pay it Forward Foundation was founded in the United States helping start a ripple effect of kindness acts around the world. The foundation had an idea for encouraging kindness acts by giving away Pay it Forward Bracelets that can be worn as a reminder. Since then, over a million Pay it Forward bracelets have been distributed in over 100 countries sparking acts of kindness. Few bracelets remain with their original recipients, however, as they circulate in the spirit of the reciprocal or generalized altruism.

PIFster, a 501(c)(3) organization that democratizes the 'Pay It Forward' concept by combining micro-donations and community voting was founded in 2023 in the United States. PIFster allows users to contribute as little as $1 per month and nominate local causes they believe deserve support. The platform then facilitates community voting to determine which nominated charities receive the collected funds. This approach empowers individuals to participate in philanthropy and directly impact their communities, regardless of their financial capacity.

In 2007, International Pay It Forward Day was founded in Australia by Blake Beattie. Pay it Forward day happens on 28 April, and has now spread to 70 countries with over 50 state and city proclamations. It is estimated that it has inspired over five million acts of kindness and has featured on 7, 9, 10, ABC, NBC, Fox 5, Fox 8 and Global News in Canada.

On April 5, 2012, WBRZ-TV, the American Broadcasting Company affiliate for the city of Baton Rouge, Louisiana, did a story on The Newton Project, a 501(c)(3) outreach organization created to demonstrate that regardless of how big the problems of the world may seem, each person can make a difference simply by taking the time to show love, appreciation and kindness to the people around them. It is based on the classic pay-it-forward concept, but demonstrates the impact of each act on the world by tracking each wristband with a unique ID number and quantifying the lives each has touched. The Newton Project's attempt to quantify the benefits of a Pay It Forward type system can be viewed by the general public at their website.

== Public health and medicine ==
Pay it forward has also been used in medicine and public health. In this context, a person is offered a free health service (a test or vaccine), then asked if they would like to donate money or non-monetary support to spur subsequent uptake of services. Several clinical trials suggest that this approach can increase test uptake. More research is needed to understand how this could be scaled up.

== Economic model ==
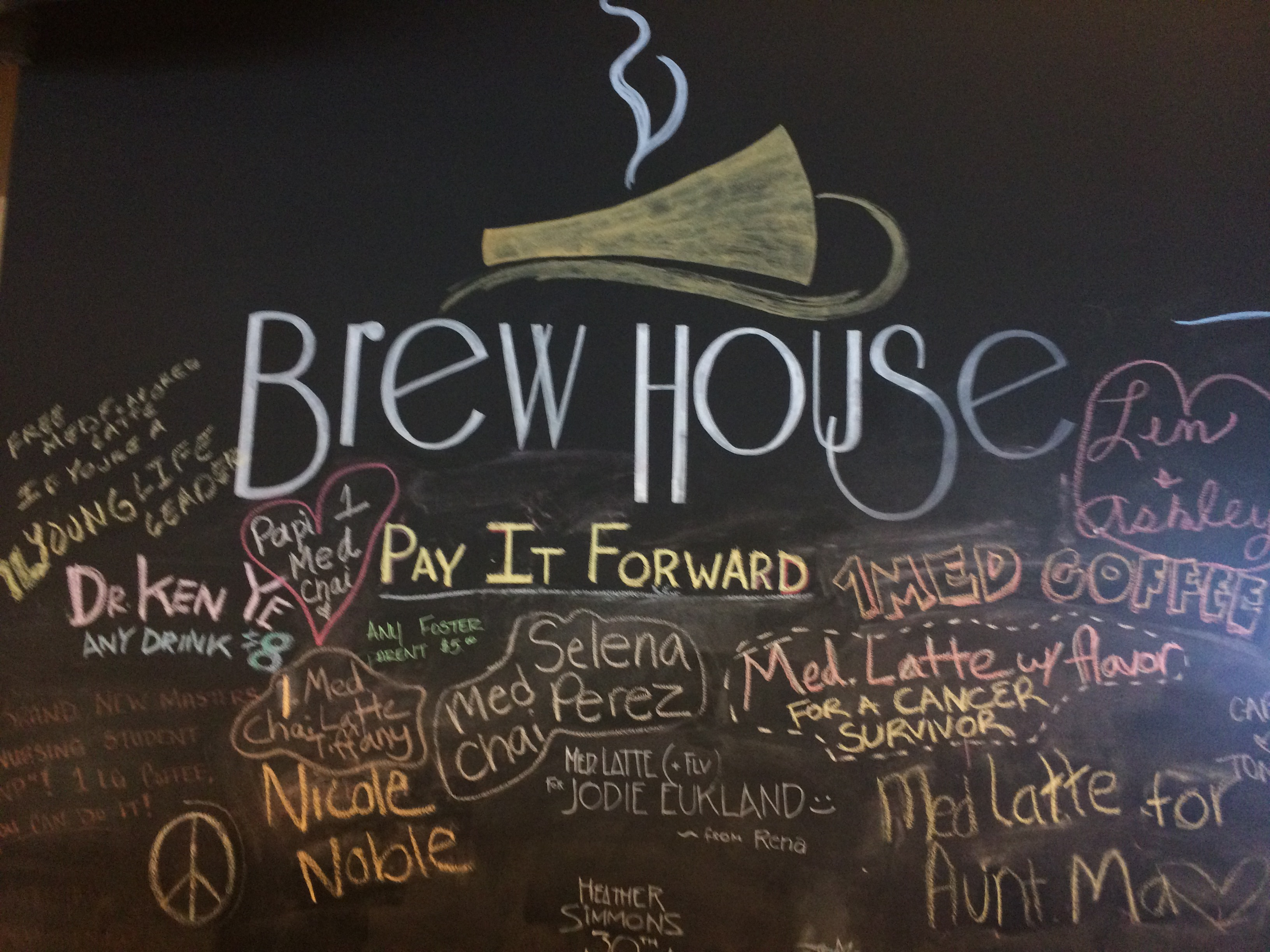
A "pay it forward" chalkboard in a coffee shop, where patrons pay in advance for drinks to be given to others

Several firms have adopted the pay it forward approach as an economic model. These include Karma Kitchen, where patrons' meals have already been paid for by previous customers, and customers are then encouraged to contribute toward future patrons' meals. Heifer Project International pioneered the approach in sustainable development, and it has been utilized by microfinance lenders. Some authors advocate the pay it forward approach be utilized as the primary means of economic transaction. In 2024, Human Kind Cafe opened in Billericay, Essex. A charity 'kindness cafe' with a pay-it-forward model, they offer suggested donations to allow everyone that is able to, to support those in need.

== Experiments and explanations ==
Several experiments document that individuals pay forward in the sense that they pass on a behavior that they have experienced. Individuals who are given more money are, for example, more likely to donate to a stranger. Individuals who are assigned easy tasks are more likely to assign someone else to an easy tasks. Finally, drivers who experience that others are insisting on their right of way are more likely to insist on their right of way.

Two explanations for the observed paying-it-forward have been considered. Evolutionary biologists and psychologists argue that being helped or harmed leads to an emotional reaction such as gratitude or anger, which in turn trigger the respective behavior. Being given an annoying task renders an individual angry and this is why she assigns an annoying task to the next person. Alternatively, individuals may learn from their experience what seems to be appropriate behavior (social learning theory). Being given an annoying task indicates to the individual that this assignment is adequate in this context. This then leads the individual to assign the annoying task to the next person.

Schnedler (2020) finds that individuals no longer pay forward if behavior cannot be directly imitated. This suggests that at least in the experiments so far paying forward is driven by social learning rather than emotions.

== See also ==
- Charity (practice)
- Feed the Deed
- Free Money Day
- Gift economy
- Random act of kindness
- Reciprocity (social psychology)
- Reciprocity (cultural anthropology)
- Six degrees of separation
- Social business
- Social responsibility
- Suspended coffee
