= Seth Porges =

American television personality

Seth Porges is an American director, producer, journalist, and television commentator. He produced, wrote, and co-directed the feature documentary Class Action Park, which premiered as the number one movie on HBO Max in August 2020. In 2014, he additionally wrote and produced a documentary short about Action Park. He also appears on numerous television shows on the History, National Geographic, Discovery, and Travel channels; including more than 40 episodes of Mysteries at the Museum.

Previously, he worked as a senior editor at Maxim magazine, as an editor at Popular Mechanics magazine, as the technology columnist at Bloomberg News and as a writer for TechCrunch. He is a graduate of Northwestern University’s Medill School of Journalism.

Porges has appeared as a guest commentator on television networks such as MSNBC, Fox News, Fox Business, CNN, and CNBC; as well as The Today Show. His writing has appeared in publications such as BusinessWeek, Men’s Health, Men’s Journal and Editor & Publisher.

He is the son of the neuroscientists Stephen Porges and C. Sue Carter, and is the subject of a song by the musician Wesley Willis. In 2009, he received attention as a test pilot on the maiden voyage of an experimental pulse jet-powered carousel. In 2006, he appeared as a contestant on Cash Cab and in 2017 was on the Fox competition show Superhuman, where he displayed his ability to spot art forgeries at a glance. In 2011, he was named as one of "50 Media Power Bachelors" by The New York Observer. and one of Stylecaster's "Top 25 IT Kids of 2011".

In 2025, The New York Times reported that Porges has created a documentary on the SantaCon annual pub crawl, based on a trove of footage of the event's early years. The documentary debuted at Doc NYC in November 2025.
