= The Kindness Offensive =

North London group known for random acts of kindness

The Kindness Offensive (TKO) is a group based in London known for orchestrating large-scale random acts of kindness, involving the distribution of industrial quantities of goods to unsuspecting members of the public and charities. The group's stated purpose is to "Practice random kindness and senseless acts of beauty", a phrase coined by Anne Herbert.

== History ==
The Kindness Offensive was formed in August 2008, when three of the four founding members (David Goodfellow, Benny Crane and James Hunter) asked members of the public in Hampstead what "random acts of kindness" they would like done for them. They received many requests from the public, and the group attempted to meet some of them by contacting companies and persuading them to donate the required goods for free, a technique developed by fourth founding member Robert Williams and referred to by the group as "phone whispering".

TKO attracted press attention in October 2008 for giving away 25 tonnes of non-perishable foods to 14 soup kitchens and drop-in centres across London, England; the event came to be known as "The Mountain of Food". This event was the first of many large-scale events centred on distributing industrial quantities of goods in short periods of time to a wide variety of locations and causes; the most notable of these were The Vinspired Kindness Offensive (2008), The White Stuff Kindness Offensive, which was widely reported as a record-breaking event (2010), The Barclaycard Kindness Offensive (2011), the Hasbro Kindness Offensive (2013), and the Read Free! Kindness Offensive. The large scale 2014 XL Catlin Kindness Offensive event resulted in the events organiser and group co-founder David Goodfellow being awarded with a Points of Light, award by the then UK Prime Minister David Cameron who acknowledged that it generated "a record-breaking Christmas toy donation".

As well as large giveaways, TKO has also staged a series of pop-up events, including The Everyday Kindness Awards in 2009. Over the course of a weekend, actors in public places pretended to need help, and when members of the public stepped up to offer a hand, they received a pop-up celebration rewarding their kindness with champagne, flowers and a gold medal.

The Kindness Offensive established their headquarters in Islington in 2013, which includes a bookshop that offers 100,000's of books free of charge to the public, and a community space whose grounds have been converted into a sensory garden for special needs students. The building has become something of a local landmark due to installations such as a set of giant broccoli and a replica TARDIS from the long running UK TV show Doctor Who.

In 2017, Joanna Bevan become the fourth member of The Kindness Offensive to be awarded a place on The Independent Happy List, in recognition of her Kindness Offensive work with special needs children and with providing free language lessons to newcomers to the UK.

== See also ==
- Altruism
- Join Me
- Kindness
- Random act of kindness
- Random Acts of Kindness Day
