= Empathy-altruism =

Form of altruism based on moral emotion

Empathy-altruism is a form of altruism based on moral emotions or feelings for others.

Social exchange theory represents a seemingly altruistic behavior which benefits the altruist and outweighs the cost the altruist bears. Thus such behavior is self-interested. In contrast, Daniel Batson holds that people help others in need out of genuine concern for the well-being of the other person. The key ingredient to such helping is empathic concern. According to Batson's empathy-altruism hypothesis, if someone feels empathy towards another person, they will help them, regardless of what they can gain from it. An alternative hypothesis is empathy-joy, which states a person helps because they find pleasure at seeing another person experience relief. When a person does not feel empathy, the standards of social exchange theory apply.

== Theoretical basis ==
=== Empathic concern and personal distress ===
Empathic concern is considered as a central component of the empathy-altruism hypothesis, it refers to an other-directed emotional response: when an individual perceives another person in distress whose well-being is threatened, they experience emotions aligned with that person's welfare (such as sympathy, tenderness, or care). For example, an observer witnessing someone suffering may feel "I hope that person gets better", rather than primarily seeking to alleviate their own discomfort. This emotion is considered the core motivator driving assistance aimed at the ultimate goal of another's well-being.

In contrast, personal distress is a self-directed negative reaction: when an individual witnesses another's pain or suffering, they first experience their own anxiety, embarrassment, guilt, or discomfort. In such cases, helping behavior often stems from alleviating one's own unease rather than purely for the other person. Thus, help motivated by personal distress tends to follow a self-serving logic. The key distinction lies in their origins: empathy serves as a "for others" motivator, while personal distress functions as an "for oneself" emotional driver to reduce discomfort. In other words, empathy generates altruistic help motivation, whereas personal distress is often linked to self-directed, escapist, or discomfort-alleviating motives.

=== Altruistic motivation and egoistic motivation ===
In the empathy–altruism hypothesis, altruistic motivation is defined as a psychological state whose ultimate goal is to enhance others' well-being, which means that the fundamental purpose of an individual's helping behavior is not self-benefit, but to improve another person's situation. In contrast, egoistic motivation posits that the ultimate goal of helping behavior lies in enhancing one's own state: individuals may engage in helping actions to obtain external rewards, avoid punishment, maintain self-image, or alleviate the internal discomfort arising from witnessing others' suffering.

The key distinction between these two types of motivation lies in the fact that seemingly similar helping behaviors may conceal fundamentally different "ultimate goals". Traditional social exchange theory, the negative-state relief model, and aversive-arousal reduction theory all contend that seemingly altruistic actions can be interpreted as self-serving strategic responses, which aims at making "oneself better" rather than "others better".The empathy–altruism hypothesis challenges this traditional assumption. According to this theory, if individuals choose to help others when experiencing empathic concern, even in situations without rewards, lacking social approval, or involving high costs, such behavior is more likely rooted in genuine altruistic motivation rather than self-interested calculation. Therefore, the theory emphasizes that when empathic concern is activated, individuals may transcend self-interested cost-benefit considerations and engage in actions aimed at improving others' well-being.

== Empirical evidence ==
=== Escape vs. No Escape ===
The "Escape vs. No Escape" experiment proposed by Batson et al. is one of the most important studies to the empathy-altruism hypothesis. In their investigation, participants began by listening to a radio-style interview about Carol, a college student who had broken her legs in a car accident, had fallen significantly behind in her work, and might drop out of college. Researchers manipulated the level of participant empathy through instructions: the high empathy condition instructed participants to imagine how Carol had felt, while the low empathy condition instructed participants to remain objective and what was being said. Subsequently, researchers manipulated whether participants could easily escape this uncomfortable situation: under the "easy escape" condition, participants could leave quickly; under the "difficult escape" condition, they had to continue watching the shock process. The results indicated that participants in the low-empathy condition behaved in ways consistent with egoistic explanations, helping rates were low when escape was easy but increased when escape was difficult. In contrast, participants in the high-empathy condition helped at consistently high rates regardless of escape difficulty. These findings suggest that high empathy elicits altruistic motivation aimed at improving others' welfare, rather than merely reducing one's own discomfort. Even when escape routes exist to lessen emotional burden, highly empathetic individuals still tend to choose to provide help.

=== Carol Study ===
The Carol Study is a seminal experiment by Toi and Batson designed to test the empathy-altruism hypothesis. In the study, participants first listened to a radio-style interview recording about Carol, a college student who suffered broken legs in a car accident, fell severely behind in her coursework, and faced the risk of dropping out. Researchers manipulated participants' empathy levels through instructions: the high empathy group was asked to imagine Carol's feelings, while the low empathy group was instructed to remain objective and focus on the informational content. Additionally, the experiment manipulated "escape cost": under the easy escape condition, Carol would continue taking classes at home, and participants would never see her again; under the difficult escape condition, she would return to the classroom in a wheelchair, making her situation visible if participants chose not to help. Results showed that the low empathy group's helping behavior depended on whether they could escape discomfort, and helping rates dropped significantly under the easy escape condition. In contrast, the high empathy group maintained highly consistent helping rates regardless of whether they would encounter Carol in the future. The study concluded that high empathy fosters altruistic motivation aimed at improving others' situations, rather than simply reducing one's own negative emotions.

=== Tests of egoistic alternatives ===
Batson et al. conducted In a series of five studies, they examined whether two types of self-serving substitution theories can be used to explain helping behavior observed under conditions of empathy. These two self-serving substitution theories are the empathy-specific reward hypothesis and the empathy-specific punishment hypothesis. An initial test of the empathy-specific reward hypothesis was given by study 1. It proposes that high empathy-driven helping behavior is driven by expectations of specific rewards (e.g., emotional uplift or social approval) rather than altruistic motives. Studies 2 through 4 conducted three distinct experimental procedures to examine the empathy-specific punishment hypothesis. This hypothesis proposed that high empathy-driven helping behavior arises from the expectation that "failure to help will result in punishment", such as heightened guilt, self-criticism and social evaluation. A stroop task was applied by Study 5 to examine potential mediating roles of different cognitions between empathy and helping behavior. Particularly, it analyzed whether reward-related, punishment-related, and victim-related cognitions played key roles, which aims to further distinguish self-serving versus altruistic interpretations. Results from all five studies failed to support either the empathy-specific reward hypothesis or the empathy-specific punishment hypothesis. Instead, each study observed higher levels of helping behavior under high empathy conditions, and these behaviors were not significantly influenced by manipulations of self-serving variables. The overall findings support the empathy-altruism hypothesis: empathy-based care can generate altruistic motivation aimed at improving others' well-being.

=== Physiological and developmental evidence ===
Beyond laboratory-based studies, cross-disciplinary support is also provided by developmental psychology and physiological psychology studies. For example, Eisenberg et al. examined different patterns of emotional arousal by recording children's physiological responses (primarily heart rate changes) when they watched others experience frustration or distress. This was combined with behavioral observations to assess whether children subsequently volunteered to assist the subjects in completing tasks. The study found that children who exhibited a moderate increasing heart rate activation tended to be experiencing an other-directed emotional state. This response pattern significantly predicted a higher probability of prosocial behaviors, such as voluntarily helping, encouraging, or assisting with the task. However, children who were exhibiting excessively intense or highly unstable physiological arousal were more likely to reflect "self-directed personal distress", which were characterized by tension, anxiety, or avoidance tendencies. These findings show that the relationship between empathic emotion and altruistic behavior is observable not only through self-reports but also through physiological indicators that differentiate other-oriented from self-oriented emotional responses. It further provides additional support for the empathy–altruism hypothesis by demonstrating that empathic concern is specifically linked to increased prosocial action from a developmental and psychophysiological perspective.

=== Neuroscience evidence ===
Interdisciplinary support for the role of empathic concern in altruistic behavior have also being provided by recent brain imaging studies. FeldmanHall et al. used fMRI to examine the relationship between costly altruism and two subcomponents of empathy, and it distinguished the roles of empathic concern and personal distress. The study found that only empathic concern strongly predicted individuals’ willingness to help others despite personal sacrifice. This relationship was accompanied by activation in brain regions associated with social attachment and caregiving, including the ventral tegmental area, caudate nucleus, and subgenual anterior cingulate cortex (ACC), which may suggest that altruistic behavior is linked to "other-directed" emotional systems.

Similarly, Brethel-Haurwitz investigated genuine "extreme altruists", such as individuals who donated kidneys to strangers, to further assess the neural basis of altruistic behavior. Compared to matched controls, extreme altruists showed greater self–other neural representation overlap in the anterior insula when observing others’ pain or threat, as well as stronger functional coupling between the anterior and mid-insula. These findings indicate that stronger neural empathic representations correspond to higher levels of real-world altruistic behavior, offering robust neurobiological evidence for empathy-driven altruism.

Taken together, these studies suggest that altruistic behavior is more likely driven by other-directed compassionate empathy rather than self-directed discomfort or emotional avoidance, providing neural-level support for the empathy–altruism hypothesis.

== Competing theories and criticisms ==
=== Egoistic alternatives ===
==== Negative-state relief model ====
This model was proposed by Robert Cialdini et al., and it explains how certain helping behaviors might come from self-serving motives rather than purely altruistic ones. From this perspective, instead of improving another's well-being, helping behavior is viewed as an approach to alleviate one's own discomfort. This theory was first systematically tested in an experiment by Cialdini, Darby, and Vincent in 1973. Participants were made to experience or witness a harmful situation. And they were manipulated to receive additional positive events (such as monetary gain or social approval) to alleviate their negative emotions. Results showed that when negative emotions were alleviated through other means, participants' helping tendencies significantly decreased, which further shows that there was no significant difference compared to a control group that never experienced the harmful situation. Furthermore, whether participants were perpetrators or observers of the harm, their helping behaviors exhibited no discernible difference. Based on this, researchers concluded that some helping behaviors might be explained by a self-serving mechanism of "reducing one's own negative emotions", rather than being driven by other-directed altruistic motives.

==== Empathic-joy hypothesis ====
The empathic-joy hypothesis is one of the primary self-serving alternative explanations to the empathy-altruism hypothesis. This hypothesis suggests that when people help others, the motivation does not arise from altruistic goals of enhancing others' well-being, it comes from seeking the "emotional positive feedback" by witenessing the recipient's improved condition, which further indicates that helping behavior is viewed as a self-serving act driven by the pursuit of emotional reward.

Batson et al. (1991) systematically tested this hypothesis through three experiments. Researchers manipulated participants' empathy levels (high/low) and controlled whether they received information about the recipient's subsequent improvement, or manipulated the probability of improvement to influence the likelihood of "positive feedback". If the "empathic joy hypothesis" was reliable, high-empathy individuals' helping behavior should be significantly influenced by "whether information about the recipient's improvement is received" or "the likelihood of improvement". However, none of the three experiments demonstrated the predicted pattern of the hypothesis. Neither feedback information, probability of improvement, nor the interaction with empathy level supported the empathy-joy hypothesis.

==== Social exchange theory ====
This theory was proposed by George C. Homans. And it is one of the key self-interested alternative theories to understand if altruism can truly be selfless. This theory states that people help others because such acts based on some form of return, which includes social rewards (such as recognition or prestige), emotional payoffs (like improved self-perception), or potential future benefits. At the same time, helping carries certain costs (time, energy, risk). Whether individuals acts depends on their weighing of rewards against costs (profit = reward − cost). Therefore, so-called "altruism" is often a self-interested choice only made after careful calculation, and helping others is a strategy for advancing one's own interests.

=== Methodological critiques ===
A common criticism is that experiments may be subject to issues of "demand characteristics". Lönnqvist and Walkowitz offer an example: researchers induced participants to feel empathy toward another player in a monetarily incentivized dictator game, then asked participants to rate their own feelings of "sympathy", "caring", and similar emotions during a manipulation check. The authors note that this assessment method itself may remind participants to the experiment's intent, which may lead them to believe researchers "want me to appear more compassionate" and report higher empathy scores on the scale rather than truly experiencing emotional empathy. This study states that items used in empathy induction may be subject to demand effects, which indicates that instead of expressing real empathetic feeling, participants respond to perceived experimental expectations.

== Application ==
Empathy–Altruism Hypothesis is broadly applied across multiple domains. In educational settings, empathy training is frequently used to enhance cooperative and supportive behaviors among students and help reduce school bullying. Within clinical and counseling contexts, cultivating empathic care helps improve satisfaction in romantic relationships, and improve therapeutic outcomes. In social and public policy, charitable organizations often leverage empathy induction to increase public willingness to donate and support vulnerable populations. Intergroup research also indicates that empathic concern can reduce prejudice and foster cross-group understanding. These applications show that empathic concern influences helping behavior not only in laboratory settings but within broader societal contexts as well.

== See also ==
- Affective neuroscience
- C. Sue Carter
- Edward O. Wilson
- Frans de Waal
- Helping behavior
- Jean Decety
- Moral emotions
- Social neuroscience
- Stephen Porges
- Sympathy
- W. D. Hamilton
