= June Reinisch =

American psychologist

June Machover Reinisch (born 1943) is an American psychologist who has helped advance the public's general knowledge of human sexual activity. From 1982 to 1993, she was director of the Kinsey Institute at Indiana University. Her research at the Institute focused on sexual and psychosexual development. She has published more than 100 scientific papers in such journals as Science, Nature, JAMA, American Psychologist, Hormones and Behavior, MMWR, JPSP, Archives of Internal Medicine, and the British and American Journals or Psychiatry.

== Biography ==
Reinisch was born and raised in New York City. Her mother was a librarian and her father was a U.S. naval officer serving as Fire Chief and Head Security Officer of the Panama Canal Zone during World War II under Admiral Kingman. He also served as Head of Regional Counter Intelligence for Central and South America and as a lieutenant in the New York City Fire Department. She received her B.Sc. in psychology from New York University, her M.A. from Columbia University Teachers College in 1966, and her Ph.D. in developmental psychology from Columbia University. Prior to returning to graduate school, she was Vice President of Publicity and Promotion for Daedalus Productions, which managed Sly and the Family Stone and Peaches & Herb. She managed The Cafe Au Go Go on Bleecker Street in Greenwich Village, New York, and was the East Coast representative for Bishop Industries including Joseph Marshall wigs, Plus White Plus toothpaste, and Hazel Bishop makeup. Reinisch taught Intro to Psychology for a time at Rutgers University New Brunswick campus in the early 1980s. She is an elected Fellow of the Society for the Scientific Study of Sexuality.

== Kinsey Institute ==
June Reinisch became the new director of the Kinsey Institute in 1982. She changed its name to "The Kinsey Institute for Research in Sex, Gender, and Reproduction". From 1984 to 1993, the newly named institute produced “The Kinsey Report", an internationally syndicated newspaper column, which she wrote three times a week. Reinisch's directorship also saw the creation of a monographic series, The Kinsey Institute Series, with the publication of Masculinity/Femininity resulting from multidisciplinary seminars sponsored by the institute. Additionally, in 1990 the establishment of the institute's art gallery led to exhibitions featuring its art collection. The next year a trade book aimed at popular audiences, The Kinsey Institute New Report on Sex: What you must know to be Sexually Literate, was released.
