= Stephen Porges =

Scientist and professor (born 1945)

- Born: Stephen W. Porges; 1945 (age 80–81); New Brunswick, New Jersey, United States
- Education: Drew University (BA); Michigan State University (MA, PhD)
- Known for: Polyvagal theory
- Scientific career
- Fields: Psychology
- Workplaces: Indiana University, University of North Carolina

Stephen W. Porges (born 1945) is an American psychologist. He is the Professor of Psychiatry at the University of North Carolina at Chapel Hill. Porges is currently Director of the Kinsey Institute Traumatic Stress Research Consortium at Indiana University Bloomington, which studies trauma. He was previously a professor at the University of Illinois Chicago, where he was director of the Brain-Body Center at the College of Medicine, and at the University of Maryland.

He served as president of the Society for Psychophysiological Research (1993-1994) and the Federation of Associations in Behavioral & Brain Sciences (1999-2002) and is a former recipient of a National Institute of Mental Health Research Scientist Development Award.

He is the author of more than 400 peer-review journal articles across several disciplines including anesthesiology, biomedical engineering, critical care medicine, ergonomics, exercise physiology, gerontology, neurology, neuroscience, obstetrics, pediatrics, psychiatry, psychology, psychometrics, space medicine, and substance abuse.

In 1994 he proposed the Polyvagal Theory, a systems-level, pathway-specific framework of autonomic regulation. Polyvagal Theory is a trans-disciplinary synthesis weaving together evolutionary biology, neurophysiology, observable behavior, and clinical insights into a framework for understanding how our nervous system states drive our behavior in the world and with one another. It has had a broad clinical influence, offering linguistic framing and conceptual and descriptive texture to phenomena observed in clinical and therapeutic contexts.

Polyvagal Theory distinguishes two vagal systems with differentiated vagal efferent pathways, functional integration, and regulatory roles. This model updates prior autonomic physiology conceptualizations predicated on the notion of autonomic balance.

The theory has generated controversy, with social neuroscientists questioning its measurement assertions, neuro-anatomy and functions of major brainstem nuclei, evolution of the vagus nerve, claims about mammalian social behavior in relation to non mammalian vertebrates, and interpretations of earlier physiological literature. Porges has responded to these claims.

== Personal life ==
He is married to scientist C. Sue Carter, and has two children: Eric Carter Porges and Seth Porges. Porges received a Bachelor of Arts from Drew University in Psychology. Later, Porges received a Master of Arts and PhD in Psychology from Michigan State University.

== Scholarships & Awards ==
- National Institute of Mental Health Research Scientist Development Award (KO2: 7/75-12/80, 12/81-8/85)
- Fellow, American Psychological Association (Divisions 6 and 7)
- Charter Member, Emeritus, and Fellow, Association for Psychological Science
- Edna Reiss – Sophie Greenberg Chair (9th annual), recognizing outstanding professionals in the field of child/adolescent mental health (2013)
- Lifetime contribution to psychophysiology awarded by the Biofeedback Foundation of Europe (2/2014)
- B.F. Skinner Lecture to the Association of Behavioral Analysis International (5/2014)
- Pierre Janet Plenary Address, International Society for the Study of Trauma and Dissociation (11/2013)
- Pioneer Award, United States Association of Body Psychotherapy (11/2018)
- Lifetime Achievement Award for breakthrough research with the Polyvagal Theory, awarded at the Annual Childhood Trauma and Attachment Conference (2021)
- Highland Park High School Hall of Honor (2022)
- Distinguished Scientist Award, Association for Applied Psychophysiology and Biofeedback (2023)
- Distinguished Pioneer Award, The Association for Comprehensive Energy Psychology (2024)
- Mental Health Hall of Fame, 4 th World Congress on Psychology and Psychotherapy (2024)

== Professional Service ==
- National Institute for Child Health and Human Development: Maternal and Child Health Research Committee (1991-1995); Chair, Maternal and Child Health Research Committee (1994-1995)
- Society for Psychophysiological Research: President-Elect (1992), President (1993), Past-President (1994), Secretary‑Treasurer (1975-1978); Board of Directors (1975‑1979, 1986-1989)
- The National Academies U.S. National Committee for the International Union of Psychological Science (2006-2009)
- Federation of Behavioral, Psychological and Cognitive Sciences (currently the Federation of Associations in Behavioral & Brain Sciences): President (1999-2002); Past President (2003); Executive Committee (1994-1997, (2005-2006)
- Honorary Ambassador for Action Trauma (2021- )
