= Kinsey Institute =

Research organization at Indiana University

- The Kinsey Institute for Research in Sex, Gender, and Reproduction

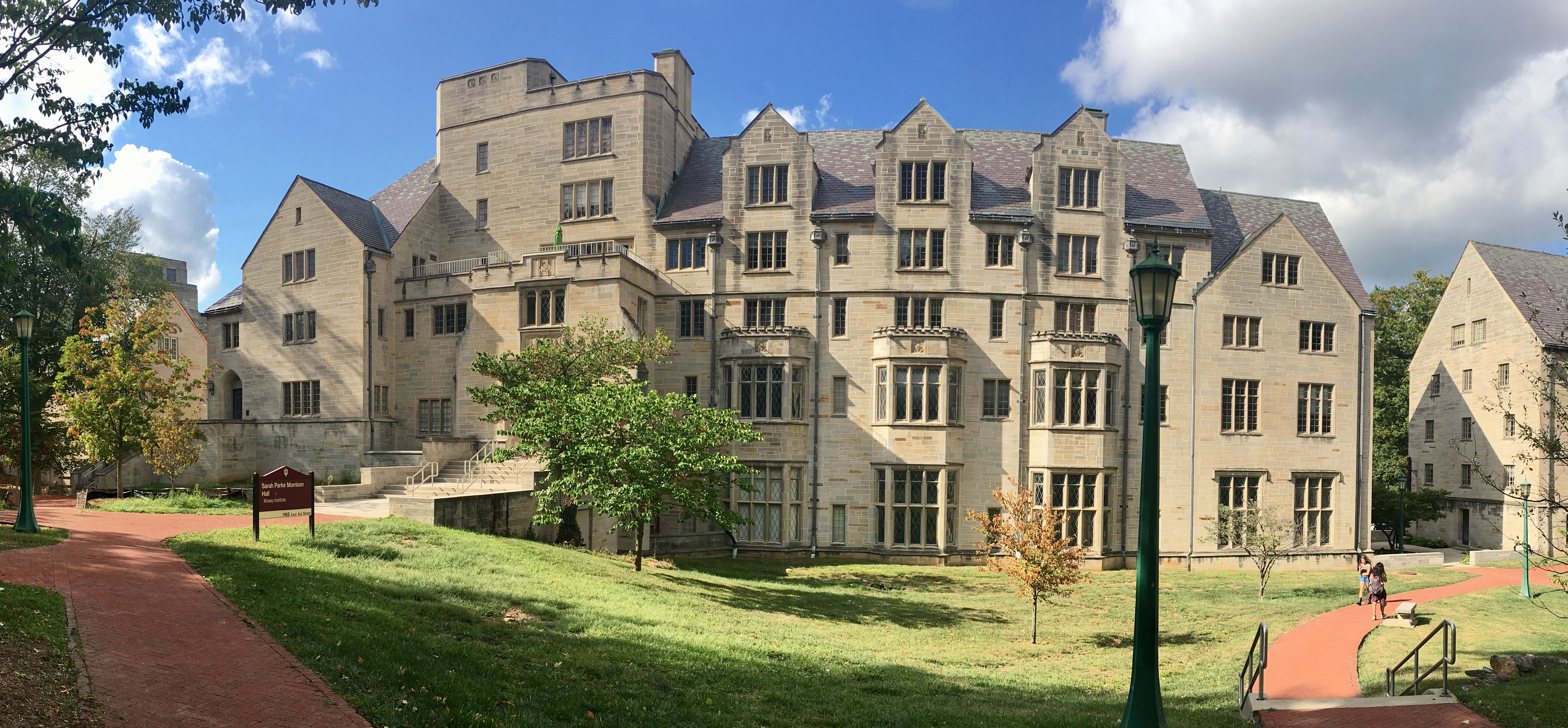
- Morrison Hall, the organization's headquarters
- Formation: 1947; 79 years ago
- Founded at: Bloomington, Indiana, U.S.
- Purpose: Produce and conserve sexual health research and information
- Origins: Work of Alfred Kinsey
- Key people: Justin Garcia (executive director)
- Parent organization: Indiana University (since 2016)
- Website: www.kinseyinstitute.org
- Formerly called: Institute for Sex Research

The Kinsey Institute for Research in Sex, Gender, and Reproduction (often shortened to The Kinsey Institute) is a research institute at Indiana University. Established in Bloomington, Indiana, in 1947 as a nonprofit, the institute merged with Indiana University in 2016, "abolishing the 1947 independent incorporation absolutely and completely."

The institute's mission is "To foster and promote a greater understanding of human sexuality and relationships through research, outreach, education, and historical preservation." Research, graduate training, information services, and the collection and preservation of library, art, and archival materials are main activities carried out by The Kinsey Institute. The institute and Alfred Kinsey himself have been the subject of much controversy. As of July 1, 2019, evolutionary biologist and sex researcher Justin Garcia holds the title of executive director of The Kinsey Institute, previously noted as the institute's research director. Garcia is the institute's eighth executive director and their youngest in history at 34 years old when appointed as executive director.

== History ==
=== Formation ===
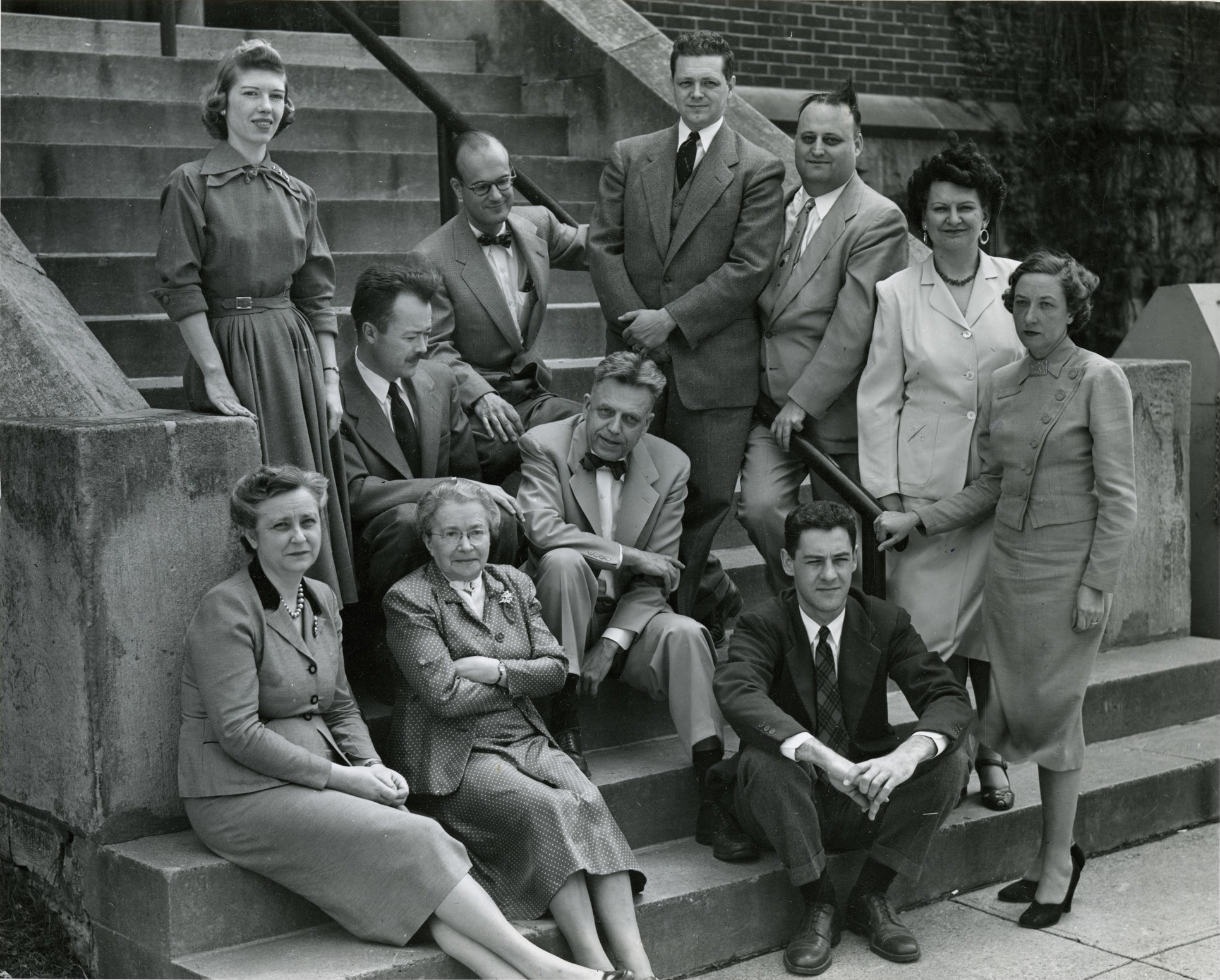
The staff of the institute in 1953. Second director Paul Gebhard is seated on the upper steps, second from left.

The origins of the Kinsey Institute lie in the scientific research of Indiana University professor and entomologist turned sexuality researcher, Alfred Kinsey. The 1947 creation of the nonprofit institute, originally named the Institute for Sex Research (ISR), was supported by both Indiana University president Herman B Wells and the Rockefeller Foundation, a major financial backer of Kinsey's research. The ISR was established to protect and preserve the confidentiality of Kinsey's data and research materials by creating a secure, permanent repository for them.

Alfred Kinsey was director of the institute from 1947 until his death in 1956. Since then, the institute has had six directors: Paul Gebhard PhD (1956–1982), June Reinisch PhD (1982–1993), Stephanie Sanders PhD (interim director, 1993–1995), John Bancroft MD (1994–2004), Julia Heiman PhD (2004–2014), C. Sue Carter PhD (2014–2019), and Justin Garcia PhD (2019–present).

=== Kinsey's directorship (1947–1956) ===
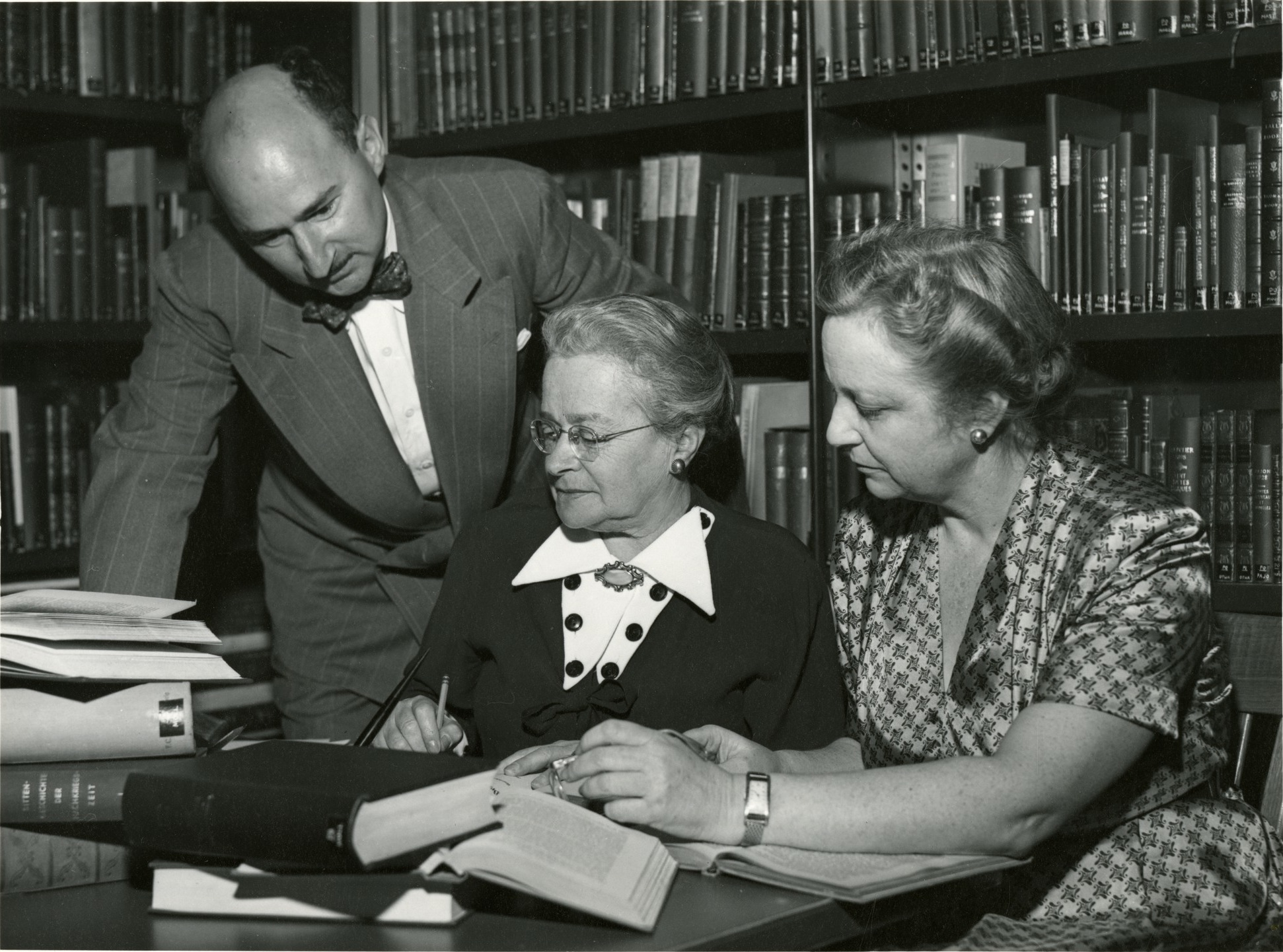
Translation of German and French sources underway in the institute's library, 1953

Shortly after the ISR's establishment, Kinsey's interview based research was published in the 1948 bestselling book, Sexual Behavior in the Human Male. Its companion Sexual Behavior in the Human Female was published five years later. These books were popularly known as the "Kinsey Reports". Also, in 1950, research materials being shipped to the ISR were seized by U.S. Customs thereby resulting in the federal court case U.S. v. 31 Photographs. This case continued on after Kinsey's death, until it was finally settled in the institute's favor in 1957. The ruling granted ISR permission to import erotic materials for "research purposes".

=== Gebhard's directorship (1956–1982) ===
Under Paul Gebhard's leadership, the interview based research project continued, resulting in the publication of Pregnancy, Birth and Abortion and Sex Offenders: An Analysis of Types. Other significant publications included JoAnn Brook's Sexual Nomenclature: A Thesaurus and Alan Bell and Martin Weinberg's Homosexualities: A Study of Diversity Among Men and Women. Additionally, in response to criticism that Kinsey's original data was biased and not well defined, Gebhard and Johnson wrote The Kinsey Data: Marginal Tabulations of the 1938-1963 Interviews. To honor its founder, the Institute for Sex Research was renamed The Kinsey Institute for Sex Research in 1981.

=== June Reinisch's directorship (1982–1993) ===
When June Machover Reinisch became the new director, the name of the institute changed to The Kinsey Institute for Research in Sex, Gender, and Reproduction, in order to better reflect its expanded mission. During her first years as director, as part of her contract with the university, the institute was completely renovated and expanded adding a new full floor for the library including temperature and humidity controlled stacks, a scholars' reading room, additional staff offices, and The John Money Visiting Scholars Study, an art gallery and new archives for the art and artifacts collections and additional research offices and laboratory space. Reinisch's directorship also saw the creation of a five-volume monographic series, The Kinsey Institute Series, beginning with the publication of Masculinity/Femininity resulting from institute-sponsored multidisciplinary seminars. Research focused on at-risk sexual behavior and the effects of prenatal exposure to medications on sexual and psychosexual development. Additionally, in 1990 the establishment of the institute's art gallery led to exhibitions featuring its art collection.

From 1984 to 1993, with direction from Indiana University to play an active role in public education, the institute produced "The Kinsey Report", an internationally syndicated newspaper column. Although "The Kinsey Report" is no longer a syndicated column, the Kinsey Institute continues to maintain a sex and sexuality FAQ and statistics page on their website. Additionally, a trade book aimed at popular audiences, The Kinsey Institute New Report on Sex: What you must know to be Sexually Literate, was released in 1991.

=== Stephanie Sanders's interim directorship (1993–1995) ===
Following June Reinisch's retirement, Stephanie Sanders held the institute's research and curriculum programs together as the Board reorganized its internal structure amid drastic budget cuts from Indiana University.

=== John Bancroft's directorship (1995–2004) ===
From 1995 to 2001, The Kinsey Institute operated a clinic for sexual health and menstrual problems under the directorship of John Bancroft. Research focus was placed upon the psychology of sexual behavior, hormonal effects on sex, and sexuality and well-being. Bancroft and Erick Janssen developed the Dual-control model of sexual arousal, a theory of sexual arousal involving inhibitory and excitation processes. In 1999, the website Kinsey Confidential (originally called Kinsey Institute Sexuality Information Service for Students) was started to provide research-based information regarding sexuality to college-aged adults. It includes sex questions and answers provided by sex researcher and columnist Debby Herbenick in both column-format and podcast-format. During the following year, the institute began regularly rotating exhibitions of artwork and archival materials in addition to offering public tours.

=== Julia Heiman's directorship (2004–2013) ===
In 2006, the institute began hosting an annual juried art show. In 2007, The Kinsey Institute also hosted the inaugural conference of The University Consortium for Sexuality Research and Training. Also, a question and answer column from the Kinsey Confidential runs in university newspapers including Indiana University's Indiana Daily Student. Ongoing research themes include such topics as condom usage, sex in long-term relationships, and hormones and reproduction.

=== Sue Carter's directorship (2014–2019) ===
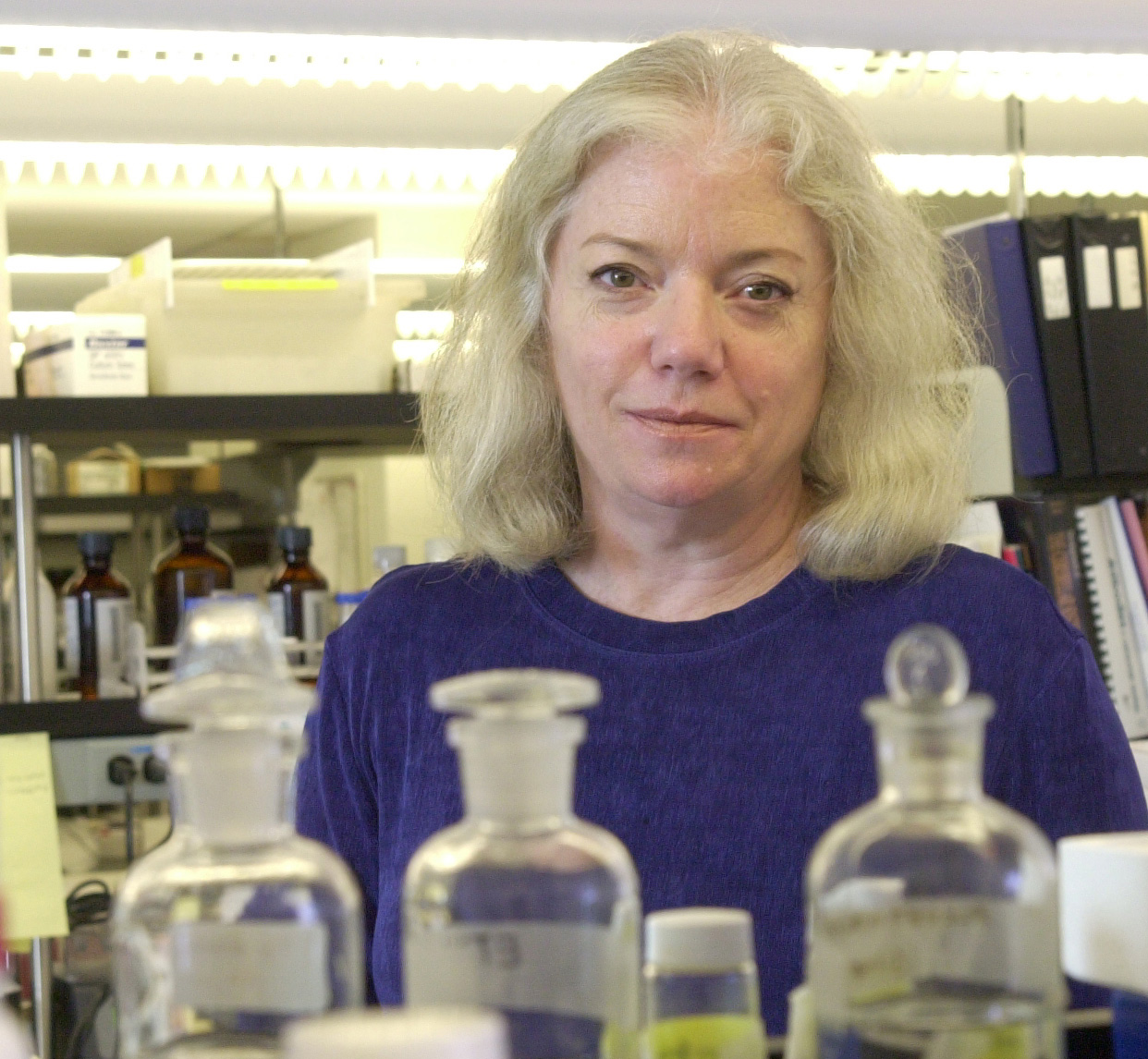
Director C. Sue Carter (pictured 2008)

Sue Carter, a pioneer in examining mechanisms underlying love, bonding and other emotions, was named director in October 2014. Carter said her directorship will emphasize love, sexuality and well-being. "I want to take Kinsey into directions that are unequivocally important" including sexual trauma, the transgender movement, and medical interventions that can affect a person's sexuality and relationships. Reflecting this broadened scope, the institute changed its tagline from "advancing sexual health and knowledge worldwide" to "explore love, sexuality, and well-being" and introduced a new red logo, a circle inscribed with a hexagonal arrangement of circular arcs. The prior logo, a stylised K designed by Enock, Inc., had been phased out around 2010–11. For most of her life, Carter has studied prairie voles. Unlike most other mammals, these voles pair-bond.

=== Justin Garcia's directorship (2019–present) ===
On July 1, 2019, evolutionary biologist and sex researcher Justin Garcia became the institute's youngest executive director at 34 years old, replacing director Sue Carter.

In 2023, the Indiana House of Representatives passed legislation banning any state funds from going to the Kinsey Institute.

In 2026, Indiana Public Media reported that Garcia and fellow Kinsey researcher Helen Fisher appeared in documents related to the activities of Jeffrey Epstein released in January 2026. Garcia had emailed Epstein in 2012 in response to an interaction with him on LinkedIn. Garcia clarified his appearance in the documents, stating, "I only later learned of his criminal background, antithetical to all of my work. I never met or spoke with him, and I did not receive any funding. I totally condemn what he did." Fisher, a Senior Research Fellow with The Kinsey Institute, met with Epstein on several occasions, dining with him and other guests, including Woody Allen, Kathy Ruemmler, and Ehud Barak.

== Library, archive, and art gallery ==
=== Library, archive, and art collection ===
The Kinsey Institute is considered to have one of the largest collections of library, archival, and art materials pertaining to sex, gender, and reproduction. The current collection began as Alfred Kinsey's private research collection. To ensure its protection, Kinsey sold it to the institute for one dollar. Over the years, neither state nor grant money have been used to build collections. Instead the institute uses funds obtained from book royalties and fees in addition to donations. A sampling of the broad range of items housed at the institute includes scientific and popular books, pulp magazines, publications from both sexual and anti-sexual organizations, data from Kinsey's original interview project, films, photos, erotic objects, and artwork by both professionals and amateurs. Items from all over the world are represented in the collection and some objects even date back to the pre-Columbian era. However, materials do not circulate and must be studied within the reading room which is open to scholars, professionals, university faculty, and students over eighteen who are researching topics pertaining to sexuality, gender, and reproduction. Due to the highly specialized nature of the collection, holdings are described using subject headings created by The Kinsey Institute and organized using a modified version of the Dewey Decimal System.

=== Art gallery ===
The Kinsey Institute's art gallery is accessible to the public and hosts a variety of exhibitions each year. Some titles of past exhibitions have included Nature & Nurture: Exploring Human Reproduction from Pregnancy through Early Childhood, Private Eyes: Amateur Art from The Kinsey Institute Collections, Eros in Asia: Erotic Art from Iran to Japan, and Sex and Presidential Politics. Exhibits featuring the institute's collection have also traveled around both the state of Indiana and country. Each year since 2006, The Kinsey Institute's annual juried art show features art work that explores themes of sexuality, gender, romance, reproduction, gender and sexual politics, the human figure, and the relation between illness and sexuality. Due to the large size of the show, it is hosted at Indiana University's SoFa gallery.
