= Random act of kindness =

Unpremeditated act to cheer up another

A random act of kindness is a unpremeditated, inconsistent action designed to offer kindness towards the outside world. The phrase "random kindness and senseless acts of beauty" was written by Anne Herbert on a placemat in Sausalito, California in 1982. It was based on the phrase "random acts of violence and senseless acts of cruelty". Herbert's book Random Kindness and Senseless Acts of Beauty was self-published in February 1993 speaking about true stories of acts of kindness. The Editors of Conari Press in Berkeley CA, had seen the phrase as graffiti on a freeway overpass and invited attendance at their new office party to come and tell their stories of Random Acts of Kindness. The result of that evening was the book "Random Acts of Kindness" published in 1993 and dedicated to Anne Herbert, which became a paperback best seller, and was the subject of over 200 radio and television interviews including being highlighted on the Oprah Winfrey show on February 15, 1994. The book also lead to the creation of the Random Acts of Kindness Foundation (currently based in Denver Colorado) and the founder of the Foundation (Will Glennon) two years later helped found the World Kindness Movement.

The phrase is commonly expressed as the suggestion to "Practice random acts of kindness." There are groups around the world who are sharing acts of spontaneous kindness.

== Examples of events or groups that have received publicity ==
- On 14 November 2012 an NYPD officer, Lawrence DePrimo, was photographed giving socks and a pair of boots he had purchased for a bare-footed homeless man. The photograph later went viral.
- Started in February 2014, the Feed the Deed campaign has inspired over 10,000 random acts of kindness around the world.
- A Chicago man, Ryan Garcia, gained a significant following after doing a different random act of kindness each day of the year in 2012. His 366 random acts have spun off into State of Kind, a mission to do an act of kindness in all 50 states in order to raise awareness for 22q11.2 deletion syndrome.

== In film and literature ==
- 1993: Random Kindness and Senseless Acts of Beauty, a 1993 children's book published by Volcano Press and authored by Anne Herbert, Margaret Paloma Pavel, and illustrated by Mayumi Oda, with a 20th-anniversary edition published in 2014 with a foreword by Archbishop Desmond Tutu, and a 30th-anniversary edition published in 2024, both by New Village Press.
- 1993: A wordplay of the phrase is evident in the dystopian novel Random Acts of Senseless Violence, by Jack Womack. The novel depicts a society in which the opposite phenomenon occurs, as the title suggests.
- In 1984, Dobbs Ferry Police officer Robert Cunningham split a winning lottery ticket with Sal's Pizzeria waitress Phyllis Penzo, netting Phyllis approx. $3M. A 1994 romantic comedy, It Could Happen to You starring Nicolas Cage and Bridget Fonda was made based on this event but moving the movie's location to New York City.
- 2002: Join Me is a book written by humorist Danny Wallace; in which he tells of the cult he started by accident, the group's purpose is to encourage members (called Joinees and collectively known as the KarmaArmy) to perform random acts of kindness, particularly on Fridays which are termed "Good Fridays". Wallace has also published a book called Random Acts of Kindness: 365 Ways to Make the World a Nicer Place.
- 2007: The film Evan Almighty ends with God telling the main character, Evan, that the way to change the world is by doing one Act of Random Kindness ("ARK") at a time.
- 2009: Karen McCombie's book The Seventeen Secrets of the Karma Club revolves around two girls who (inspired by their favourite film Amélie) start up their 'Karma Club', the intention of which, is to do random acts of kindness anonymously.
- An Australian TV show named Random Acts of Kindness, on Channel 9, shows hosts Karl Stefanovic, Scott Cam and Simmone Jade Mackinnon giving gifts to people they identify as heroes.
- 2020: The Rotary Club of Makati Central of District 3830 launches a social media challenge for members of Rotaract to join the Random Act of Kindness Award or RAK Award, for short.

== See also ==
- Altruism
- Charity (practice)
- Charitable organization
- Effective altruism
- Empathy-altruism
- Free Money Day
- Mitzvah
- Pay it forward
- Parable of the Good Samaritan
- Philanthropy
- The Sheep and the Goats
- Random Acts of Kindness Day
- Volunteerism
