= IMM Graduate School =

South African private college

- Type: Private educational institution Specialist business education Marketing and supply chain management education Undergraduate and postgraduate business studies
- Established: 1948
- Executive Academic Head: Angela Bruwer
- Location: Parktown (Johannesburg), Pretoria, Stellenbosch, Cape Town, Durban, Harare (Zimbabwe)
- Campus: Blended hybrid and distance learning
- Colours: Blue and dark grey
- Website: imm.ac.za

The IMM Graduate School is a private higher education institution in South Africa and forms part of the UXi Education group. It offers programmes in business education, with particular emphasis on marketing management, business management, supply chain management, and project management.

The institution provides a range of qualifications, including higher certificates, diplomas, undergraduate degrees, honours degrees, and postgraduate qualifications.

The institution enrols students from more than 20 countries, including Botswana, Burundi, China, Congo, France, India, Ireland, Kenya, Lesotho, Malawi, Mauritania, Mozambique, Namibia, Nigeria, Serbia, Sierra Leone, South Africa, Swaziland, Thailand, the United Kingdom, Zambia, and Zimbabwe.

The current Executive Academic Head is Angela Bruwer.

== Programmes ==
The IMM Graduate School is registered to offer the following programmes:

=== Marketing ===
==== Undergraduate ====
- Higher Certificate in Marketing (SAQA ID: 86826)
- Diploma in Marketing Management (SAQA ID: 79546)
- Bachelor of Business Administration in Marketing Management (SAQA ID: 80967)
- Bachelor of Commerce in Marketing and Management Science (SAQA ID: 90737)

==== Postgraduate ====
- Postgraduate Diploma in Marketing Management (SAQA ID: 79846)
- Bachelor of Philosophy Honours in Marketing Management (SAQA ID: 79366)
- Master of Philosophy in Marketing (SAQA ID: 86806)

=== Supply Chain and Project Management ===
==== Undergraduate ====
- Higher Certificate in Supply Chain Management (SAQA ID: 117683)
- Higher Certificate in Project Management (SAQA ID: 118438)
- Bachelor of Commerce in International Supply Chain Management (SAQA ID: 110628)

==== Postgraduate ====
- Bachelor of Commerce Honours in Supply Chain Management (SAQA ID: 117085)
- Master of Commerce in Supply Chain Management (SAQA ID: 124669)

== Campuses and Student Support Centres ==
The IMM Graduate School operates multiple locations across South Africa and Zimbabwe, comprising two campuses and four Student Support Centres.

=== Campuses ===
- Parktown, Johannesburg: Number 2, 3rd Avenue, Parktown
- Stellenbosch: Floor 2, Bosmans Business Centre, 1 Distillery Street, Bosman’s Crossing

=== Student Support Centres ===
- Groenkloof, Pretoria: Harlequins Office Park, 164 Totius Street
- Durban: Kings Park Stadium, Suite 752 – Ramp 4, Jacko Jackson Drive, Stamford Hill
- Cape Town: Floor 1, The Cape Town Cruise Terminal (next to Makers Landing), V&A Waterfront
- Harare, Zimbabwe: 105 Nigel Philip Avenue, Eastlea

== Professional memberships ==
- Association of Private Providers of Education, Training and Development (APPETD)
- National Association of Distance Education and Open Learning in South Africa ([NADEOSA)
- Distance Education Association of South Africa (DEASA)
- The Chartered Institute of Logistics and Transport (CILT)

== Industry partnerships ==
The IMM Graduate School is the only CIM accredited institution in South Africa. The Chartered Institute of Marketing (CIM) was founded in 1911. It has over 30,000 members, including more than 3,000 registered Chartered Marketers. CIM offers 130 study centres in 36 countries, and exam centres in 132 countries.
