= C. Sue Carter =

American biologist and behavioral neurobiologist

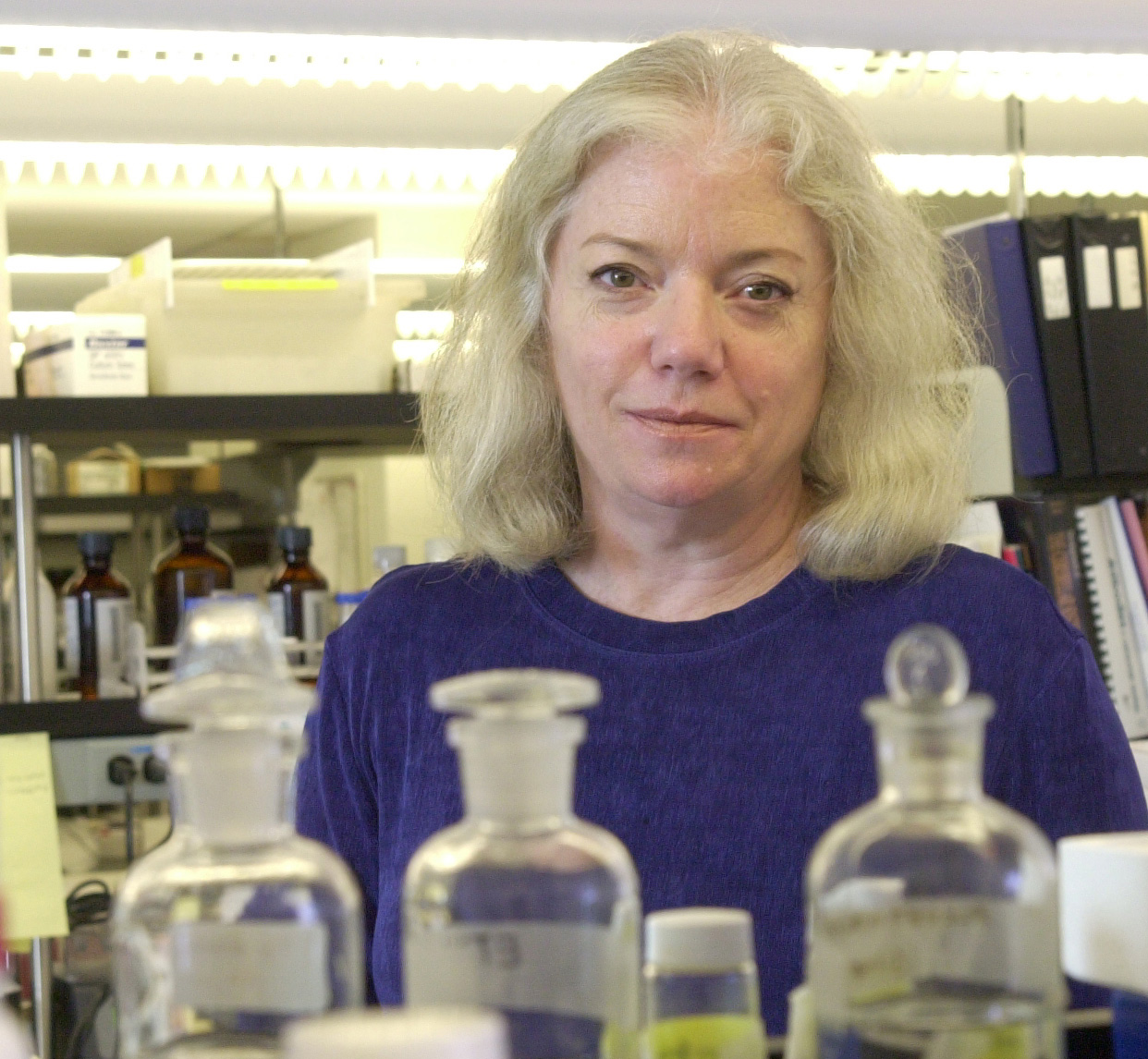
- Born: San Francisco, California, United States
- Education: University of Arkansas
- Known for: Characterizing the role of Oxytocin and Vasopressin in the neurobiology of monogamy and love
- Awards: American Association for the Advancement of Science
- Scientific career
- Fields: Behavioral neuroscience
- Workplaces: The Kinsey Institute; University of Virginia

C. Sue Carter is an American biologist and behavioral neurobiologist. She is an internationally recognized expert in behavioral neuroendocrinology and holds appointments as Rudy Professor Emerita of Biology at Indiana University and Professor of Psychology at University of Virginia. She also served as Director of The Kinsey Institute from 2014-2019. Carter was the first person to identify the physiological mechanisms responsible for social monogamy.

== Background ==
Carter studied biology at Drury College in Springfield, Missouri. She completed a PhD in Zoology at the University of Arkansas in Fayetteville.

Carter is a Fellow of the American Association for the Advancement of Science.

She is married to Stephen Porges, and has two children: Eric Carter Porges (currently a graduate student at the University of Chicago in Integrative Neuroscience) in Jean Decety's Social Cognitive Neuroscience Laboratory, and Seth Porges (currently an editor at Maxim magazine in New York City, and previously an editor at Popular Mechanics magazine).

== Academic achievements ==
Carter studies social bonding, male and female parental behavior, the social control of stress reactivity and the social control of reproduction, often using animal models such as the socially monogamous prairie vole. Carter's research focuses on neuropeptide and steroid hormones, including oxytocin, vasopressin, corticotropin-releasing hormone, and estrogen. Her research program has discovered important new developmental functions for oxytocin and vasopressin, and implicated these hormones in the regulation of long-lasting neural and effects of early social experiences. She also has a long-standing concern regarding the consequences of medical manipulations for human development and parent-child interactions, including the use of "pitocin" – a synthetic version of oxytocin – to induce labor and consequences of breastfeeding for the mother and child. Most recently she has been examining the role of oxytocin and vasopressin in mental disorders such as autism, schizophrenia, anxiety and depression. Carter is also known for research on the physiological basis of social behavior, including studies that implicated oxytocin, vasopressin and hormones of the hypothalamic-pituitary-adrenal ("stress") axis in the traits of monogamy including pair-bond formation. She pioneered the physiological study of socially monogamous mammals, including the prairie vole. In collaboration with zoologist Lowell Getz, Carter documented the occurrence of social monogamy in prairie voles. Her studies in rodents helped to lay the foundation for the studies of behavioral and developmental effects of oxytocin and vasopressin in humans which are in progress. In collaboration with psychiatrist Margaret Altemus she conducted some of the first studies documenting the importance of breastfeeding in the regulation of maternal physiology.

== Honors ==
Carter is a Fellow and Past-President of the International Behavioral Neuroscience Society and a recipient of the Matthew J. Wayner-NNOXe Pharmaceuticals Award for distinguished lifetime contributions to behavioral neuroscience.

== Criticism ==
Author and LGBT activist Dan Savage claimed the announcement of Carter's appointment to Director of the Kinsey Institute was "packed with bad news for anyone interested in sex research and/or conducting sex research (particularly those conducting sex research at the Kinsey Institute)" and "Carter's pseudo-scientific/pseudo-empathetic moralizing plays right into the hands of the kind of conservative politicians who have been trying to kill the Kinsey Institute for decades." Savage criticized Carter's view that, "I think human sexuality must be viewed in the context of relationships," countering, "Not all human sexuality exists in the context of relationships. You can argue, if you're a moralist, that human sexuality should only be expressed in the context of a relationship. But that is a moral position, not a scientific one."

== Selected publications ==
- Carter C.S., Getz L.L. (1993) Monogamy and the prairie vole, Scientific American 268: 100–106
- Carter C.S. & Keverne EB. (2002) The neurobiology of social affiliation and pair bonding, In Hormones, Brain and Behavior, edited by D. Pfaff, pp. 299–337, Academic Press, San Diego CA
- Carter C.S. (2003) Developmental consequences of oxytocin. Physiology and Behavior 79: 383–397
- Carter C.S. (2007) Sex differences in oxytocin and vasopressin: Implications for autism spectrum disorders?, Behavioural Brain Research. 176: 170–186
- Goldman M., Marlow-O'Connor M., Torres I., Carter C.S. (2008) Diminished plasma oxytocin in schizophrenic patients with neuroendocrine dysfunction and emotional deficits, Schizophrenia Research 98: 247–55
- Carter C.S., Grippo A.J., Pournajafi-Nazarloo H., Ruscio M.G., Porges S.W. (2008) Oxytocin, vasopressin and social behavior, Progress in Brain Research 170: 331–336

== Books ==
- Carter C.S. (1974) Hormones and Sexual Behavior, Dowden, Hutchinson, & Ross, Inc., In Benchmark Papers in Animal Behavior series
- Carter C.S., Lederhendler I.I. & Kirkpatrick B. (1997) The Integrative Neurobiology of Affiliation, Annals of the New York Academy of Sciences 807 (Re-released by MIT Press, Cambridge, MA, 1999)
- Uvnas-Moberg, K. & Carter, C.S. (1998) Special issue of Psychoneuroendocrinology: Proceedings of a Conference Sponsored by the Wenner-Gren Foundation: Stockholm, Sweden entitled Is There a Neurobiology of Love?
- Cacciopo J., Berntson G.G., Adolphs R., Carter C.S., Davidson, J., McClintock, M.K., McEwen, B.S. Meaney, M.J., Schacter, D.L., Sternberg, E.M., Suomi, S.S. & Taylor, S.E. (2002) Foundations in Social Neuroscience, A Bradford Book, MIT Press, Cambridge MA
- Carter C.S., Ahnert L., Grossmann K., Hardy S.B., Lamb M., Porges S.W., & Sachser N. (eds.) (2005) Attachment and Bonding: A New Synthesis, MIT Press, Cambridge MA

== See also ==
- Biological psychology
- Psychiatry
- Neuroendocrinology
- Neuropeptides
- Neuroscience
- Love
- Evolution
- Social cognition
- Social Neuroscience
