= Free Money Day =

Annual global event

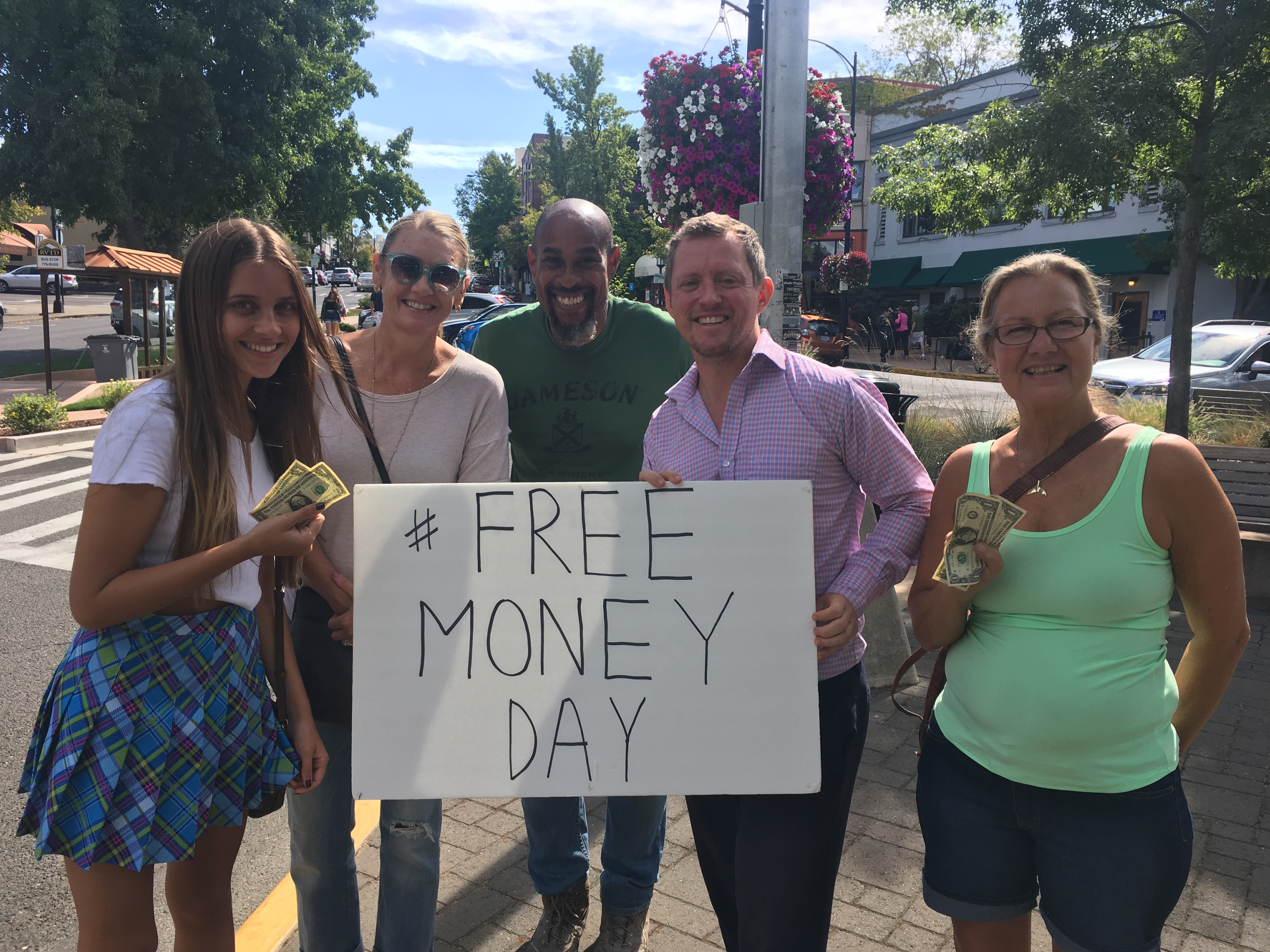
- Free Money Day 2019
- Status: Active
- Date: September 15th
- Frequency: Annual
- Location: International
- Inaugurated: 2011
- Organiser: Post Growth Institute
- Website: freemoneyday.org

Free Money Day is a global social experiment held annually on September 15, the anniversary of the Lehman Brothers' 2008 filing for bankruptcy. Participants hand out money to strangers, asking them to pass half onto someone else. Money is exchanged in person, left as a surprise for someone to find, or sent digitally. Founded in 2011 by Donnie Maclurcan, co-founder and co-director of the Post Growth Institute, Free Money Day is a social experiment that is meant to explore people's attachment to money and remind people that it must freely circulate in a successful economy, as noted by Maclurcan:

"Just like any system in the human and eco-sphere requires circulation, whether it's nitrogen or oxygen flowing through our ecology, whether it's blood flowing through our bodies. We need money which is the lifeblood of the economy to circulate – and currently, it doesn't."

Since its inception, Free Money Day has been celebrated through 324 events organized in 218 locations in 35 countries, with many more unreported events.

Free Money Day is an initiative of the Post Growth Institute (PGI), an international, not-for-profit organization leading the shift to a world where people, companies and nature thrive together within ecological limits. The PGI works collaboratively to develop ideas, programs, events and alliances that promote the equitable circulation of money, power and resources in our local communities and global economy.

In addition to sharing money, people have sought alternative ways to participate in Free Money Day. This has included giving out money to strangers in exchange for them listening to their music, organizing a free sewing workshop, or a video store handing out free movie rentals to customers.

== See also ==
- Feed the Deed
- GiveDirectly
- Heterodox economics
- Mitzvah
- Post-growth
- Random Acts of Kindness Day
- Room for more funding
- Universal basic income
