= Personal distress =

Type of emotional reaction

In psychology, personal distress is an aversive, self-focused emotional reaction (e.g., anxiety, worry, discomfort) to the apprehension or comprehension of another's emotional state or condition. This negative affective state often occurs as a result of emotional contagion when there is confusion between self and other. Unlike empathy, personal distress does not have to be congruent with the other's state, and often leads to a self-oriented, egoistic reaction to reduce it, by withdrawing from the stressor, for example, thereby decreasing the likelihood of prosocial behavior. There is evidence that sympathy and personal distress are subjectively different, have different somatic and physiological correlates, and relate in different ways to prosocial behavior.

== Link to risk and resistance ==
In 1987, one study conducted cross-sectional and longitudinal research on a community sample of over 400 adults and their children to examine the link between risk, resistance, and personal distress. It can be stated risk factors consisted of negative life events and avoidance coping strategies and, for children, parental emotional and physical distress. On the contrary, resistance factors were self-confidence, an easygoing disposition, and family support. Furthermore, outcome criteria were global depression and physical symptoms in adults, and psychological maladjustment and physical health problems in their children.

The survey findings showed that persons who simultaneously experience high risk and low resistance are especially vulnerable to personal distress. Moreover, the results demonstrated that the risk and resistance variables are significant predictors of concurrent and future psychological and physical distress in adults. In children, the findings demonstrated that parental dysfunction, especially maternal risk factors and family support, are significantly linked to distress. However, these findings also suggested that, in comparison to adults, children may be more resilient to past negative life events affecting their current or future levels of distress. Furthermore, it was noted that children are affected more by mothers' than fathers' functioning, which is congruent with the conventional role of mothers as primary caregivers and with children's relatively stronger maternal attachment relationships.

== Development ==
A study was conducted with two groups — children and adults — who each watched a video depicting a distressing news story. While viewing the video, their facial expressions were recorded, and they later provided self-reports of their emotional responses.

The results revealed a clear distinction between sympathy and personal distress. Markers of sympathy were associated with prosocial responses, whereas facial indicators of personal distress were not. Among adults, facial expressions of sadness and displays of concerned attention were positively correlated with prosocial tendencies. In contrast, among children, facial expressions linked to personal distress were negatively correlated with prosocial behaviour.

These findings demonstrate not only that sympathy and personal distress are distinct emotional reactions, but also that age and developmental level influence how individuals experience and express these emotions.

== See also ==
- Common coding theory
- Emotional contagion
- Identification (psychology)
- Mirror neurons
