= Relational models theory =

Theory of interpersonal relationships

Relational models theory (RMT) is a theory of interpersonal relationships, authored by anthropologist Alan Fiske and initially developed from his fieldwork in Burkina Faso. RMT proposes that all human interactions can be described in terms of just four "relational models", or elementary forms of human relations: communal sharing, authority ranking, equality matching and market pricing (to these are added the limiting cases of asocial and null interactions, whereby people do not coordinate with reference to any shared principle).

RMT influenced Jonathan Haidt's moral foundations theory and Steven Pinker's theory of indirect speech.

== Theory ==
First proposed in Fiske's doctoral dissertation in 1985, relational models theory proposes four relational models which are each argued to be innate, intrinsically motivated, and culturally universal (though with culture-specific implementations) ways of cooperating and coordinating social interactions.

=== Four relational models ===
The four relational models are as follows:

- Communal sharing (CS) relationships are the most basic form of relationship where some bounded group of people are conceived as equivalent, undifferentiated and interchangeable such that distinct individual identities are disregarded and commonalities are emphasized, with intimate and kinship relations being prototypical examples of CS relationship. Common indicators of CS relationships include body markings or modifications, synchronous movement, rituals, sharing of food, or physical intimacy.
- Authority ranking (AR) relationships describe asymmetric relationships where people are linearly ordered along some hierarchical social dimension. The primary feature of an AR relationship is whether a person ranks above or below each other person. Those higher in rank hold greater authority, prestige and privileges, while subordinates are entitled to guidance and protection. Military ranks are a prototypical example of an AR relationship.
- Equality matching (EM) relationships are those characterized by various forms of one-for-one correspondence, such as turn taking, in-kind reciprocity, tit-for-tat retaliation, or eye-for-an-eye revenge. Parties in EM relationships are primarily concerned with ensuring the relationship is in a balanced state. Non-intimate acquaintances are a prototypical example.
- Market pricing (MP) relationships revolve around a model of proportionality where people attend to ratios and rates and relevant features are typically reduced to a single value or utility metric that allows the comparison (e.g., the price of a sale). Monetary transactions are a prototypical example of MP relationships.

=== Meta-relational models ===
We cannot understand individual psychology, dyadic social relationships, or group psychology unless we understand the combinatorics of social relationships. There are "syntactical" models for conjoining relationships, including models whereby particular relationships entail other specific relationships. And some relationships preclude certain other relationships.

— Alan Fiske on meta-relational models

The four elementary relationships can be combined to form more complex configurations of relationships called meta-relational models. Meta-relational models typically take the form of entailments or prohibitions, which imply certain obligations, behaviors or relationships between multiple dyads within a particular configuration (e.g., within a triad with members A, B and C, A being in a CS relationship with B prohibits B from being in a CS relationship with A's enemy, C). Examples of meta-relational models include the compadrazgo relationship, describing the entailment of relationships between the parents and godparents of a child, and the incest taboo, describing the prohibition of relationships among certain members of the same family.

=== Relational models as an explanation of interpersonal conflict ===
According to RMT, mis-matching of relational models is a common cause of interpersonal conflict, given that different relational models will often imply different behaviors in the same situation. Taking two housemates sharing dishwashing as a simple example, Fiske suggests that if housemate A assumes dishwashing is governed by a CS framework and housemate B assumes an EM framework, A will expect both of them to wash dishes whenever they can, and B will expect them to take turns. If A is busy and B is not, A will expect B to wash the dishes, but if B washed the dishes last, they'll assume it's A's turn, and conflict will ensue because of A and B's mis-matched relational models.

=== Correspondence between relational models and Stevens's levels of measurement ===
Fiske proposed that the four discrete types of relationships correspond to Stevens's four levels of measurement. CS relationships resemble the categorical (nominal) scales of measurement in that all members of the relationship are equivalent. AR resembles an ordinal scale given that members of the relationship are placed in a linear ordering. EM relationships resemble interval measurement given that they are kept in balance by addition and subtraction. Finally, MP relationships resemble a ratio scale (whose origin corresponds, for example, to a price of zero) given that they involve proportions, multiplication and division and the distributive law.

== Influence ==
The two main, original publications on relational models theory have received over 5000 citations combined.

=== In moral psychology ===
Relational models theory has had wide-ranging influence throughout the field of moral psychology. This influence includes an extension of the original theory to explain moral judgments in the context of interpersonal relationships in the form of relationship regulation theory, which describes the way in which people will judge and react to similar actions differently, depending on the relational context in which the act occurs. Relational models theory has also been used to explain interpersonal violence in the form of virtuous violence theory, describing the moral motivations behind phenomena such as honor killing and blood feuds. The theory has also been used as a building block of one of the more prominent theories in moral psychology, moral foundations theory, and to provide insights into phenomena such as moral emotions, trust and ethical leadership.

=== In other areas ===
RMT has been influential in the development of Steven Pinker's theory of indirect speech, and folk-psychological studies of groups. Additionally, RMT has also been used to help explain the positive social emotion of "Kama Muta", typically described as the experience of "being moved" (also related to the emotion elevation, and the concept of empathic concern). According to this view, "Kama Muta" is triggered by witnessing the sudden intensification of a communal sharing relationship.
