= Self-pity =

Feeling sorry for oneself

Self-pity is an emotion in which one feels self-centered sorrow and pity toward the self regarding one's own internal and external experiences of suffering. It is typically caused by stress and is accompanied by feelings of sadness and injustice, often characterized by envy of those who are perceived as luckier. Typical inner monologues revolve around questions such as "why me?" or "what did I do to deserve this?". Self-pity has also been defined as an emotion directed towards others with the goal of attracting attention, empathy, or help.

== Description ==
The feeling of self-pity typically arises when an individual attributes failures to external factors perceived as uncontrollable. Psychologists note that self-pity is triggered by physical or mental suffering, though this suffering does not necessarily need to be severe or long-lasting. Moments of self-pity occur in everyone, but they play a significant role in insecure personality types—described by Eugen Kahn as oversensitive "thin-skinned" individuals, "bad losers". It is also closely linked to depression and melancholia.

Although the primary focus of self-pity is on the self and one's own emotions, it has a strong interpersonal component. Individuals prone to self-pity focus on their failures, difficulties, and losses, often using it as an attempt to attract attention and sympathy. In addition to loneliness, subjects may feel envy, blame, anger, and hostility directed towards others.

It is common for people suffering from self-pity to deflect criticism. They are usually incapable of self-reflection and blame their bad situation only on external factors, such as bad luck or other people's supposed resentment. Self-pity is different from self-compassion, which consists of extending compassion to oneself in cases of failure or general suffering.

== Effects ==
Research based on observation of self-pity shows it can be an effect of a stressor from a dramatic event. Aspects of an individual's personality can also influence their self-pity. Psychologists note that relying on self-pity is a poor social strategy. Although others initially respond to self-pity with empathic concern, the interpersonal effects of frequent expression can be detrimental, and prolonged self-pity begins to repel others. Even in the case of chronic illnesses, society expects individuals to eventually accept their fate and stop complaining.

Because individuals prone to self-pity expect more from society and loved ones than they can receive, the emotion is often accompanied by loneliness and bitterness, leading to constant frustration. Individuals who engage in pervasive self-pity may be rejected by peers and perceived as querulous. When self-pity leads to hostility, the individual may struggle to express this aggressiveness due to low self-confidence and fear of damaging relationships. As a result, the aggression is suppressed and redirected inward, or it manifests as thoughts of revenge for past events.

== In antiquity ==
David Konstan notes that Ancient Greek had no specific word for self-pity. This is because the Greeks viewed pity as an emotion requiring two separate people: the one who pities and the one being pitied. Aristotle argued that pity could not be felt for close family members because family ties make the feeling almost identical to feeling for oneself. The Stoics argued that pity and envy form a pair; pity arises from seeing undeserved suffering, while envy arises from seeing undeserved happiness. According to this theory, just as it is impossible to envy oneself, it is impossible to pity oneself. Aristotle called the emotion related to realizing a loved one's misfortune compassion and linked it to friendship, suggesting that since one can be friends with oneself, compassion could be reflexive.

In Ancient Greek tragedies, when a hero pities himself, he typically observes himself from the outside. For example, in Euripides' tragedy Hippolytus, when the protagonist is falsely accused, he remarks that if he could look at himself, he would weep at his own suffering.

Similarly, when heroes in the works of Plutarch cry, it is almost always a manifestation of pity for others rather than for themselves. In Plutarch's writings, when Perseus of Macedon expressed self-pity, he immediately lost the sympathy of Lucius Aemilius Paullus Macedonicus. The Romans generally considered the split personality inherent in self-pity to be a sign of femininity that was unbefitting of a man.

== Treatment ==
As self-pity is observed to be associated with rumination and avoidance coping strategies, it is an important emotional experience to acknowledge in therapeutic settings.

== See also ==
- Moral emotions
- Pity
- Self-compassion
- Self-conscious emotions
- Social emotions
- Victim mentality
- Victim playing
- Pity – movie about the emotion

== Sources ==
- Dutsch, Dorota M. (2008). Feminine Discourse in Roman Comedy: On Echoes and Voices. Oxford University Press. ISBN 978-0191559860.
- Fögen, Thorsten (2009). Tears in the Graeco-Roman World. Walter de Gruyter. ISBN 9783110201116.
- Kahn, Eugen (1965). "Self-pity". American Journal of Psychiatry. 122 (4): 447–451. doi:10.1176/ajp.122.4.447.
- Konstan, David (1999). "Pity and Self-Pity". Electronic Antiquity. 5 (2).
- Petric, Domina (January 2019). "Self-Pity and The Knot Theory of Mind". ResearchGate.
- Stoeber, Joachim (2003). "Self-Pity: Exploring the Links to Personality, Control Beliefs, and Anger" (PDF). Journal of Personality. 71 (2): 183–220. doi:10.1111/1467-6494.7102004. PMID 12693515.
- Weiner, Bernard (October 2014). "The Attribution Approach to Emotion and Motivation: History, Hypotheses, Home Runs, Headaches/Heartaches". Emotion Review. 6 (4): 353–361. doi:10.1177/1754073914534502. ISSN 1754-0739.
