= Elevation (emotion) =

Emotion elicited by witnessing virtuous acts

Elevation is a moral emotion elicited by witnessing actual or imagined virtuous acts of remarkable moral goodness. It is experienced as a distinct feeling of warmth and expansion that is accompanied by appreciation and affection for the individual whose exceptional conduct is being observed. Elevation motivates those who experience it to open up to, affiliate with, and assist others. Elevation makes an individual feel lifted up and optimistic about humanity.

Elevation can also be a deliberate act, characteristic habit, or virtue that is characterized by disdaining the trivial or undignified in favor of more exalted or noble themes. Henry David Thoreau recommended, for example that a person "read not the Times [but rather] read the Eternities" so that he "elevates his aim."

== Background/overview ==
Elevation is defined as an emotional response to moral beauty. It is related to awe and wonder. It encompasses both the physical feelings and motivational effects that an individual experiences after witnessing acts of compassion or virtue.

Psychologist Jonathan Haidt also posits that elevation is the opposite of social disgust, which is the reaction to reading about or witnessing "any atrocious deed." Haidt insists that elevation is worth studying because we cannot fully understand human morality until we can explain how and why humans are so powerfully affected by the sight of strangers helping one another.

The goal of positive psychology is to bring about a balanced reappraisal of human nature and human potential. Positive psychologists are interested in understanding the motivations behind prosocial behavior in order to learn how to encourage individuals to help and care for each other. Thus, the field attempts to discern what causes individuals to act altruistically. While there is a great deal of research about individual acts of altruism, the amount of research done about a person's reaction to the altruism of others is surprisingly low. It is an oversight that Jonathan Haidt and others like him have striven to correct.

== Major theories ==
=== Haidt's third dimension of social cognition ===
Haidt asserts that elevation elicits warm, pleasurable sensations in the chest, and it also motivates individuals to act more virtuously themselves. In his explanation of elevation, Haidt describes the three dimensions of social cognition:

The horizontal dimension of solidarity
People vary in distance to the self in regards to affection and mutual obligation. For example, across cultures individuals act differently toward their friends than toward strangers.

The vertical dimension of hierarchy, status, or power
People moderate their social exchanges by the relative status of the people whom they are interacting with.

The vertical dimension of "elevation versus degradation" or "purity versus pollution"
People vary in their state and trait levels of spiritual purity. When people feel disgust toward certain behaviors, this emotion informs them that someone else is moving down on this third dimension. Haidt defines elevation as the opposite of disgust, because witnessing others rise on the third dimension causes the viewer to also feel higher on this dimension.

=== Fredrickson's broaden and build theory ===
Elevation exemplifies Barbara Fredrickson's broaden and build theory of positive emotions, which asserts that positive emotions expand an individual's scope of attention and cognition in the moment while also building resources for the future. Elevation makes an individual feel admiration for the altruist and also more motivated to help others. Elevation has the potential to spread by creating an upward helping spiral in which individuals view others doing good deeds and then feel an increased urge to help others.

=== Elevation as an other-praising emotion ===
Sara Algoe and Jonathan Haidt claim that elevation is in the "other-praising" family of emotions along with gratitude and admiration. These three emotions are positive reactions to witnessing the actions of exemplary others. The outcome of all three "other-praising" emotions is a focus on other people.

Algoe and Haidt provided empirical evidence to support this theory. They conducted a study in which participants were prompted to remember a time when they had experienced an event that would elicit elevation, gratitude, admiration, or joy. The participants then completed a questionnaire. Their results suggest that the "other-praising" emotions are different from happiness and distinct from each other due to differing motivational impulses. Elevation motivates individuals to be open and compassionate towards other people. Compared to joy or amusement, people experiencing elevation were more likely to express a desire to perform kind or helpful actions for others, become better people, and imitate the virtuous exemplar.

=== Elevation as a self-transcendent positive emotion ===
Michelle Shiota and others assert that elevation is a self-transcendent positive emotion that serves to direct attention away from the self towards appreciating an exceptional human action or remarkable aspect of the natural world. In doing so, elevation encourages individuals to transcend daily routines, limits, and perceived boundaries.

Shiota et al. describe how elevation functions as a moral emotion. It directs a person's judgments regarding others' morality and influences the person's own ensuing moral decisions in ways that may circumvent or precede logical moral reasoning. Elevation may have the adaptive function of motivating people to help others while also assisting those who experience the emotion. For example, elevation may help individuals select with partiality their caring relationship partners by eliciting affection for people who exhibit altruism or compassion. Elevation may also help foster norms of helping in groups or communities. When one member of a community witnesses another helping, they are likely to feel elevated and immediately or briefly in time react by helping someone else in the group. This is due to the mutual benefits of biological altruism.

== Major empirical findings ==
=== Difference from happiness ===
Researchers have shown that the patterns of physical sensations and motivations generated by elevation are different to those caused by happiness. They induced elevation in a laboratory setting by showing undergraduates a ten-minute video clip documenting the life of Mother Teresa. In the control conditions, students were either shown a documentary that was emotionally neutral or a clip from America's Funniest Home Videos. Those in the elevation condition were more likely to report physical feelings of warmth or tingling in their chests. They were also more likely to express a desire to help or associate with others and to cultivate themselves to become better people. They found that happiness caused people to engage in more self-focused or internal pursuits, while elevation appeared to turn participants' attention outward toward other people.

=== Increased oxytocin in nursing mothers ===
Jennifer Silvers and Jonathan Haidt found that elevation may increase the amount of oxytocin circulating in the body by promoting the release of the hormone. In their study, nursing mothers and their infants watched video clips that either evoked elevation or amusement. Mothers who watched the elevation-inducing clip were more likely to nurse, leak milk, or cuddle their babies. These actions are associated with oxytocin and thus suggest a possible physiological mechanism underlying feelings of elevation.

=== Increased prosocial behavior ===
Results from two studies conducted by Simone Schnall and others suggest that viewing an altruistic act increases a person's motivation to act prosocially.

In the first study, participants either viewed a clip of professional musicians expressing gratitude to their mentors, which was designed to elicit elevation, or a neutral video. People who watched the elevation-evoking video were more likely to agree to help with a later, uncompensated study than those in a neutral state.

In the second experiment, participants were assigned to watch either an elevation film clip, control film clip, or a clip from a British comedy program. They were then asked if they would help the researcher complete a tedious questionnaire filled with math problems for as long as they agreed to keep going. Participants who reported feeling elevated helped the experimenter with the tedious task for almost twice as much time than the participants who were amused or were in the control condition. Also, the length of time that the participants assisted was predicted by self-reported characteristics of subjective elevation such as desiring to help others and feeling hopeful about humanity; however, helping time was individually variable and not predicted by positive affect in general.

Keith Cox studied undergraduates on a spring break service trip and discovered that those who reported more extreme and repeated experiences of elevation during the trip did more trip-specific volunteer activities related to their outing when they arrived home. These findings imply that the experience of elevation moved students to volunteer in the area in which they felt elevation.

=== Improving functioning in clinically depressed and anxious individuals ===
Research shows that elevation can contribute to emotional and social functioning in clinically depressed and anxious individuals. For ten days, participants completed brief daily surveys to assess elevation, feelings of competence, interpersonal functioning, symptoms, and compassionate goals. Their findings indicated that on days that clinically distressed individuals experienced high elevation in relation to their normal levels, they reported a greater desire to help others and to be close to others. They also reported less interpersonal conflict and fewer symptoms of distress. This emotion thus motivates people for making them feel better.

== Applications ==
=== In the workplace ===
In a 2010 study, Michelangelo Vianello, Elisa Maria Galliani, and Jonathan Haidt found that an employer's ability to inspire elevation in employees strengthened positive attitudes and enhanced virtuous organizational behavior. It appears that employees pay a great deal of attention to the moral behavior of their superiors and respond positively to the display of fairness and moral integrity. Such displays inspire moral elevation and result in intense positive emotions. According to this study, employers could benefit from the positive effects associated with elevation and should actively strive to inspire it in their subordinates.

=== Promoting altruistic behavior ===
A study done at the University of Cambridge shows that elevation leads to an increase in altruism. In the study, individuals experiencing elevation were more likely to volunteer to participate in an unpaid study. Those experiencing elevation also spent twice as long helping an experimenter to perform tedious tasks as those who were experiencing mirth or a neutral emotional state. The researchers concluded that witnessing another person's altruistic behavior elicits elevation, which leads to tangible increases in altruism. According to these results, the best method of encouraging altruistic behavior may be simply to lead by example.

=== Increasing spirituality ===
Researchers found that elevation and other self-transcendent positive emotions cause people to view others and the world as more benevolent. This perception leads to increased spirituality, because seeing a person or action that is greater than oneself results in greater faith in the goodness of people and the world. It may also cause those who experience the emotion to view life as more meaningful. The researchers observed the greatest effect of elevation on spirituality in people who were less or non-religious. Because spirituality has been connected to prosocial behavior, this link could indicate other benefits of elevation. Holding a more positive view of the world could lead to increased helping behavior, which could encourage many positive interactions. This increase in positive experiences could lead to improved well-being and better health outcomes in individuals; instead of getting caught up in daily stress and negativity, they will be better able to identify and cultivate the positive aspects of their lives through their actions towards others thus motivated.

== Elevation emotion in other species ==
There has been some debate in the scientific community over whether elevation is a uniquely human trait. Primatologist Jane Goodall argues that other animals are capable of experiencing awe, elevation, and wonder. Goodall is famous for her execution of the longest uninterrupted study of a group of animals. She lived among wild chimpanzees in Tanzania, observing them for 45 years. Several times, she witnessed signs of heightened arousal in chimpanzees in the presence of spectacular waterfalls or rainstorms. Each time, the chimp would perform a magnificent display, swaying rhythmically from one foot to the other, stamping in the water, and throwing rocks. Goodall postulates that such displays are the precursors of religious ritual, and are inspired by feelings akin to elevation or awe.

== Further research directions ==
Most research concerning elevation has emphasized its impact on social interactions and behaviors. However, researchers are investigating the precise physiological mechanisms responsible for the warm, open sensation in the chest elicited by elevation. Video clips designed to evoke elevation have been observed to lead to a decrease in vagal parasympathetic impact on the heart. However, further investigation is necessary in order to determine whether elevation has a unique physiological profile.

Researchers are exploring the idea that profound experiences of elevation can be peak experiences that can alter people's identities and spiritual lives. While moral development is often conceptualized as a lifelong process, Haidt offers an "inspire and rewire" hypothesis which proposes that certain momentary experiences have the potential to induce temporary or even lasting moral changes by exposing individuals to these transformative experiences. Haidt suggests that instances of profound elevation can function as a "mental reset button," replacing cynical or pessimistic emotions with feelings of hope, love, and moral inspiration.

== See also ==
- Admiration – Social emotion
- Artistic inspiration – Unconscious burst of creativity
- Awe – Emotion comparable to wonder
- Gratitude – Feeling or attitude in acknowledgement of a benefit that one has received or will receive
- Kindness priming (psychology)
- Moral psychology – Interdisciplinary field of study
- Mudita – Sympathetic or vicarious joy in Sanskrit and Pali
- Positive psychology – Approach of psychological scientific study
