= Psychology of collecting =

Area of study

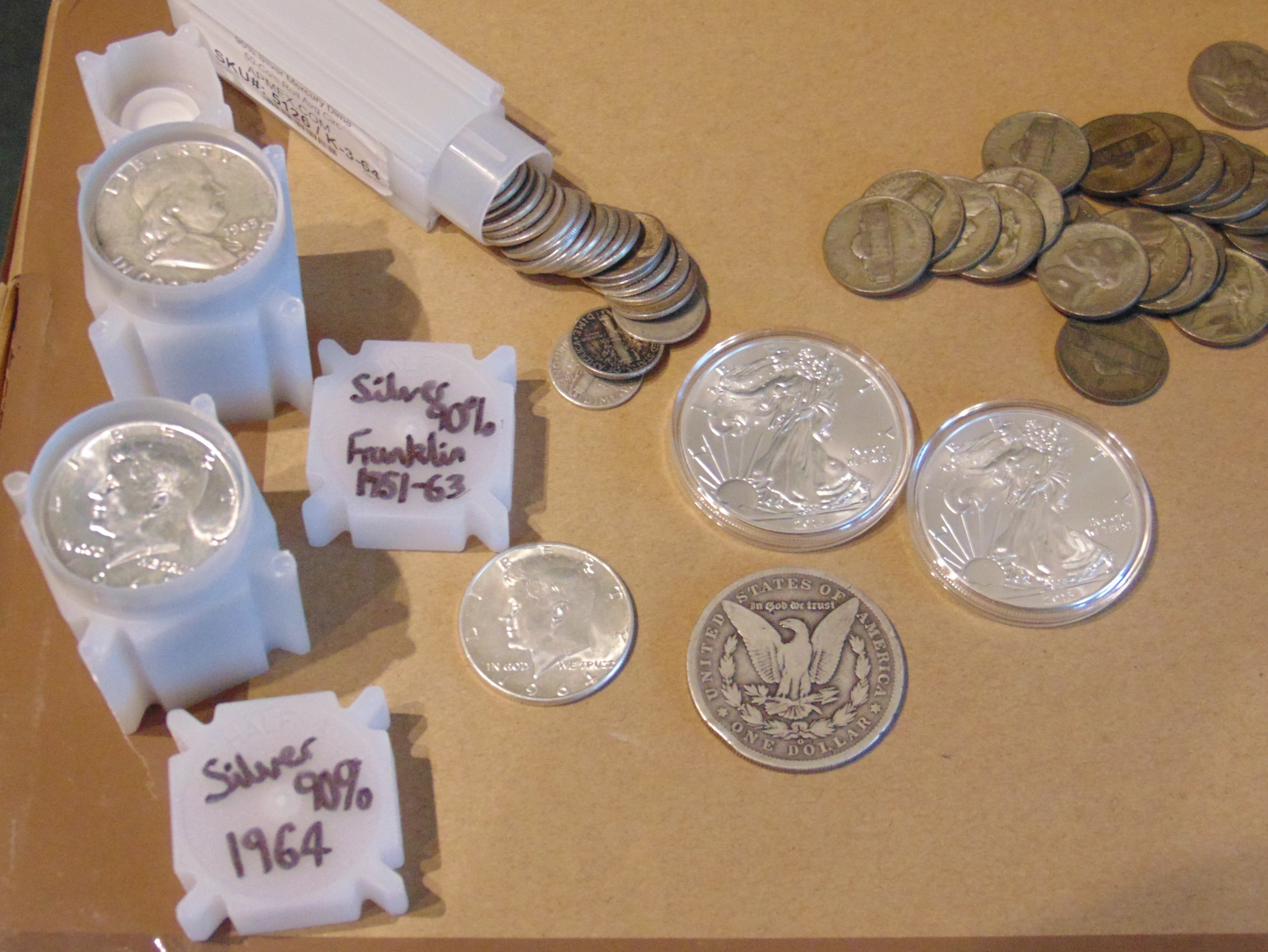
A selection of various silver coins, a common example of collectable objects, as well as plastic containers to store them in

The psychology of collecting is an area of study that seeks to understand the motivating factors explaining why people devote time, money, and energy making and maintaining collections. There exist a variety of theories for why collecting behavior occurs, including consumerism, materialism, neurobiology and psychoanalytic theory. The psychology of collecting also offers insight into variance between similar behavior that can be recognised on a continuum between being beneficial as a hobby and also capable of being a mental disorder. The large diversity of different types of collected objects and variance of collecting behaviors across these types has also been subject to research in psychology, marketing and game design.

Collecting is known to be a common behavior, with one estimate suggests that 40% of United States households engage in some form of collecting behavior, with another source suggesting a global estimate closer to 30% assuming low variance between countries.

== Motivations for collecting ==
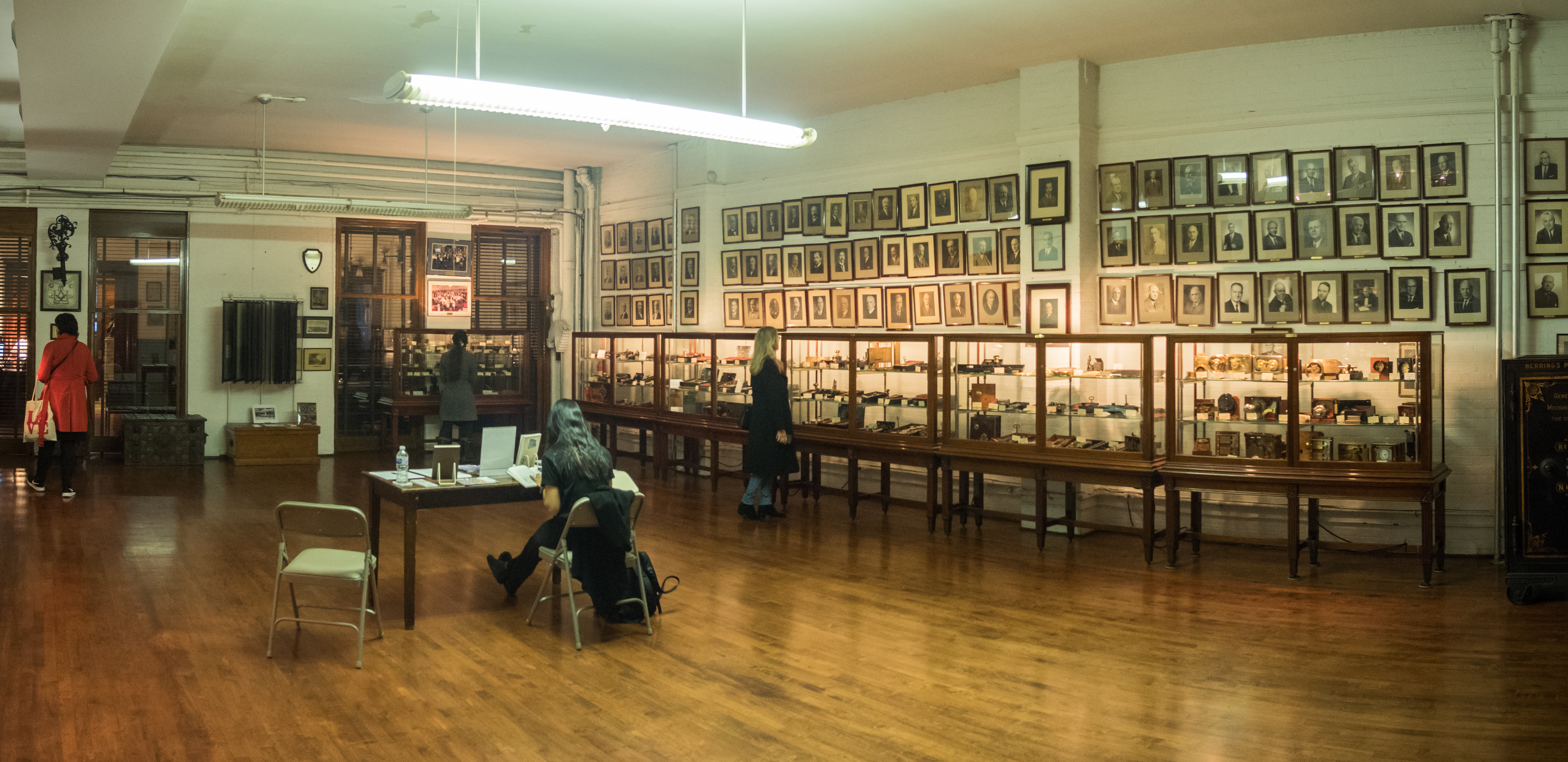
Collections such as this one of locks showcase the diversity of what people collect.

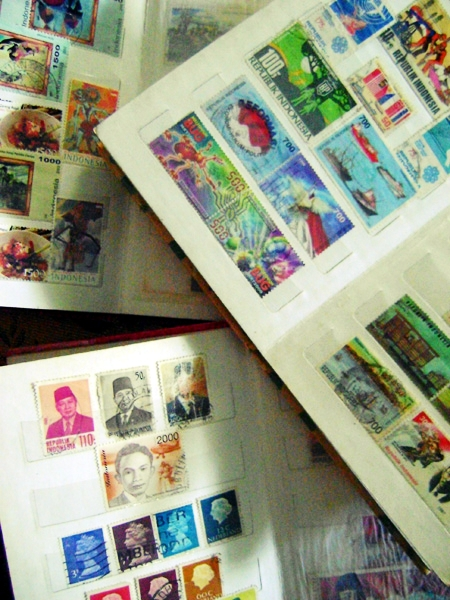
Philately, the collecting of postage stamps, is a popular worldwide form of collecting.

Although collections often include physical objects, marketing research theorises that collection may be in pursuit of something less tangible such as an experience, idea or feeling. This forms a foundation for applying theories of consumerism and materialism, which posit some intrinsic value separate from monetary value such as luxury, passion, spirituality, solidarity or nostalgia that motivates consumer behavior. The social environment in which collecting occurs may also lead to competition over acquiring objects, and cooperation in the form of sharing knowledge about objects, which according to the theory motivates researching, cataloging, displaying and admiring collections. Motives are not mutually exclusive, and different motives may combine or intersect for different collectors. Since these motivations are not restricted to a particular stage of life, collecting is sometimes considered a lifelong pursuit which can never be fully completed.

Virtual forms of collecting are diverse, and can vary from collectible objects like equipment, characters, vehicles or mounts, to less material possessions such as skins in video games or achievements, or currencies and objects valued primarily for rarity, memorability, or market value. These virtual collections may have effects on game mechanics, or be acquired to reflect the personality of players through appearance.

The scope of collecting behavior in academia is difficult to define due to its large scope and many functions. It can include physical and virtual objects, along with intangible objects such as collecting jokes or proverbs. This difficulty is illustrated by the following quote:

At some point in the process the objects have to be deliberately viewed by their owner or potential owner as a collection, and this implies intentional selection, acquisition and disposal. It also means that some kind of specific value is set upon the group by its possessor, and with the recognition of value comes the giving of a part of self-identity. But collecting is too complex and too human an activity to be dealt with summarily by way of definitions.

— Susan M. Pearce, University of Leicester

== Comparison to hoarding ==
Collecting as a hobby can become hoarding or compulsive hoarding, differing in that covering a large amount of living area with possessions leads to significant distress or impairment. Compulsive hoarding, also known as hoarding disorder, is a diagnosable mental disorder in the DSM-5 and is closely related to obsessive–compulsive disorder and obsessive–compulsive personality disorder. Collecting, hoarding and compulsive hoarding are considered to lie on a continuum of the same underlying behaviors, and assessment of these behaviors generally falls into two general categories of obsessive-compulsive behavior with hoarding subscales, and hoarding measures independent of obsessive-compulsive behavior.

The crossover from collecting as a hobby, to hoarding as maladaptive behavior, has also been expressed in anecdotes. Bryan Petrulis, an American autograph collector, stated "It gets addictive, [...] just like gambling, drugs or sex. It's like putting a coin in a slot machine. It might not pay off this time, so you put another quarter in and keep doing it until you are tapped out or finally hit the jackpot."

== Neurobiology ==
Neurobiological theories have suggested that collecting behaviors can in some cases be explained by brain damage or abnormalities. This research posits levels of collecting behavior result from abnormalities in the medial prefrontal cortex, which also serves to explain the poor outcomes of psychosocial interventions. (Note: Abstract says "mesial prefrontal cortex"; assumed typo in publication) The prefrontal cortex is a region of the brain responsible for regulating cognitive behaviors such as decision making, information processing, and organizing behavior. Evidence also exists to support this hypothesis for damage to the ventromedial prefrontal cortex. There are also cases where other brain damage distributed throughout the right and left hemispheres was believed to cause hoarding behavior.

== Psychoanalytic theory ==
Up until the 1990s, Freudian and psychoanalytic theories were historically used to describe why people collect. Early theories began in the early- and mid-1900s based on both theories of psychosexual development and drive theory. Freud suggested the idea that collecting stems from toilet training behavior. In the late 1990s, the popularity of relational models theories, such as self psychology led to the application of these theories to describe collecting as well, which pose the idea that collecting establishes a better sense of self. The psychoanalytic perspective generally identified five main motivations for collecting: for selfish purposes; for selfless purposes; as preservation, restoration, history, and a sense of continuity; as financial investment and as a form of addiction. Addictive collecting was termed hoarding and reflected a "dark side" of collecting behavior.
