= Admiration =

Social emotion

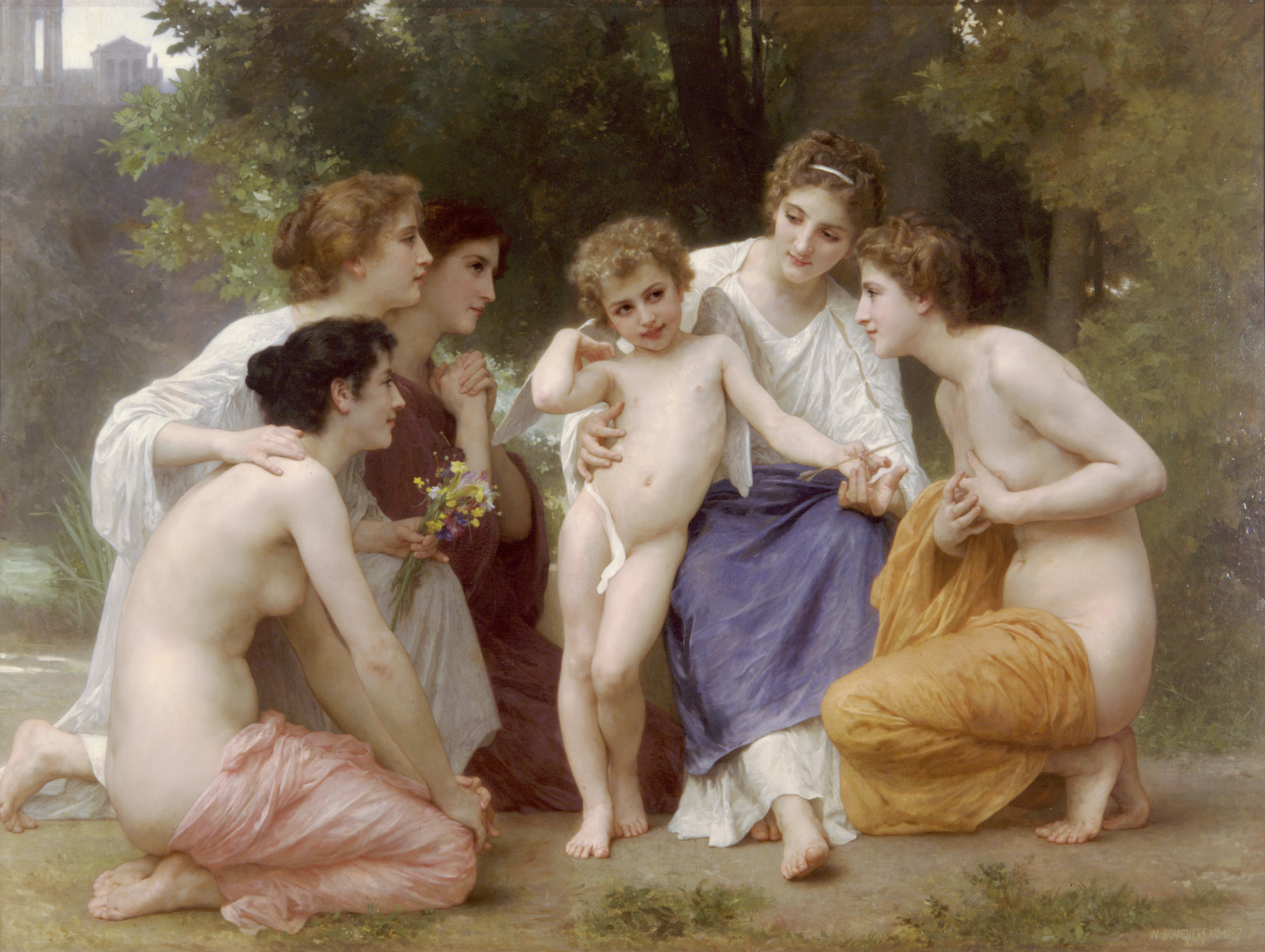
Admiration by William-Adolphe Bouguereau, 1897

Admiration is a social emotion felt by observing people of competence, talent, virtuous actions, or skill exceeding standards. Admiration facilitates social learning in groups. Admiration motivates self-improvement through learning from role-models. Admiration is not automatically induced, but is built from active mental evaluations of social and real world knowledge.

== Definition ==
Sara Algoe and Jonathan Haidt include admiration in the category of other-praising emotions, alongside awe, elevation, and gratitude. They propose that admiration is the emotion we feel towards non-moral excellence (i.e., witnessing an act of excellent skill), while elevation is the emotion we feel towards moral excellence (i.e., witnessing someone perform an act of exceeding virtue). Other authors term both these emotions as admiration, distinguishing between admiration for skill and admiration for virtue. Richard Smith categorises admiration as an other-focused assimilative emotion, leading people to aspire to be like (assimilate to) those they admire. He contrasts admiration with envy (an other-focused contrastive emotion), proposing that envy leads us to feel frustrated about the competence of others, while admiration is uplifting and motivating.

== Function ==
Learning of skills has been so important to our evolution that we have come to feel positively about talented or skillful people, in order to approach them and copy their actions. Admiration is the emotion that facilitates learning in social groups, and is associated with reflection on the admired individual’s skills and a tendency to imitate.

Admiration plays a key role in the transmission of skills and knowledge through the emulation of admired individuals, even without the need to form close personal bonds with them. It is found that admiration is associated with higher recall of information about the target. Admiration heightens our memory and attention towards high-quality information sources, encouraging learning of skills and imitation through prolonged gazes at the admired and seeking their proximity. It is also linked to self expansion, the increased efficacy in achieving one’s goals through the acquisition of new resources, perspectives and identities. Rather than merely fostering affiliation, admiration motivates individuals to strive for excellence in domains they find personally meaningful.

The importance of reflecting on the admired target to learn their skill aligns with theory of goal implementation, which distinguishes between two distinct phases in goal pursuit: a deliberative phase, where individuals evaluate and choose the most effective strategy, and an implementation stage, where those chosen actions are executed.

Admiration is associated with a tendency to imitate the admired target, however, whether imitation actually occurs depends on motivational and situational factors. This is because admiration has been shown to increase energy, heart rate, and muscle tension, which are physiological indicators of action readiness, and because it is consistently linked with the desire to learn from the admired person or group.

== Relation to attainability ==
Following from the view that admiration's function is learning and self-improvement, some authors have proposed that admiration will only activate and drive action when we believe improvement is possible for us, however one empirical study has suggested the opposite, that admiration is akin to passive contemplation of another's superiority and does not stimulate higher performance, while envy is the motivating emotion which activates when a better performance is attainable to us.

Supporting this, the study shows that role models that trigger benign envy have a greater impact on an individual’s performance than those that elicit admiration. When self-improvement is seen as within one’s control, people are more likely to feel benign envy rather than admiration when comparing themselves to someone superior. Whereas, when improvement feels out of one’s control, individuals tend to report stronger feelings of admiration. Notably, participants who experienced benign envy also often reported admiration as well.

There are similar effects in group-based admiration. Higher levels of admiration for an outgroup were found only when individuals believed their own group had the potential to improve in the future. In such cases, admiration may foster greater openness to learning from the outgroup and increase the willingness to seek their help.

== Personality traits linked to admiration ==
Personality traits play a role in shaping emotional responses to role models. Individuals with a strong tendency to compare themselves to others are more likely to improve their performance when exposed to a role model they perceive as attainable.

According to research using the Big Five Personality model, those who are more prone to admiration tend to score high on openness to experience, extraversion, and agreeableness. This is because these traits are associated with a greater likelihood of experiencing positive, other-praising emotions such as admiration.

== Associated behaviours ==
=== Behaviours concerning the self ===
Witnessing admirable acts has been shown to increase motivation for self-improvement in the domain of witnessed excellence (e.g., sporting performance), but also a more general motivation to work towards achieving one's own life goals. When people feel deep admiration for someone’s virtuous actions, they often experience a strong personal drive to live more meaningfully and to pursue morally good or noble goals themselves.

==== Neurophysiological correlates of Admiration ====
Using fMRI, admiration has been shown to be related with higher-level cognitive processes involved in motivation (e.g., planning, pursuit of goals), but also relates to lower-level activating mechanisms, demonstrating that admiration is a physically energising emotion. Neuroimaging research revealed that admiration activates both high-level cognitive systems, such as those involved in memory and social reasoning, and low-level systems related to bodily sensations and biological regulations, especially those tied to “gut feelings”.

The neural localization of admiration was investigated using fMRI by evoking feelings of admiration in participants, revealing specific brain regions involved in the experience. They found that when people experience admiration for virtue, regions such as the anterior insula and anterior cingulate cortex become active. These areas are involved in introspection and emotional salience. They also engage the posteromedial cortex, associated with self-reflection and model processing, as well as the hypothalamus and brainstem, which are involved in homeostatic regulation. Activation in the brainstem and cortical areas related to consciousness and self-awareness suggests that admiration is not purely a cognitive emotion but also has strong bodily components that help boost and maintain motivation. Additionally, admiration has been linked to increased blood flow to brain systems that regulate unconscious functions, such as blood pressure, hormone levels, and overall biological survival.

Looking at Autonomic nervous system (ANS) response, admiration is associated with physiological signs of activation, such as increased heart rate and muscles tensed, reflecting a high state of energy and readiness to act.

=== Behaviours concerning the relationship ===
Admiration is associated with interpersonal tendencies such as showing an increased willingness to receive help from others. Admiration is also associated with a tendency to praise the admired act to others, and a desire for contact and proximity with the admired, in order to build relationships with the admired person to maximise their ability to learn further.

Admiration serves a communicative function, signaling to the admired person that their skill or performance is valued. This recognition can reinforce prestige and motivate the admired to continue their excellence. In addition to this direct impact, Admiration often prompts individuals to share their positive impressions of the admired person with others. This behaviour can further enhance the admired individual’s reputation.

== Group-based ==
Admiration has also been studied in an intergroup context by Susan Fiske and her colleagues. Group-based admiration leads to positive outcomes in intergroup relations. They propose that admiration is the emotion we feel towards those social groups we perceive as competent (or high-status), legitimate and warm (friendly and cooperative) (e.g., in studies involving students in the US, an example of a group perceived as competent and warm is the British). Admiration is related to intentions to associate, cooperate with, and help members from groups that are admired.

Intergroup admiration is linked to both active and passive facilitation of outgroups (e.g., helping and cooperation), and it also plays a communicative role by signaling value, reinforcing prestige, and supporting leader-follower dynamics. These functions contribute to admiration’s broader role in regulating intergroup behavior and maintaining social hierarchy. When admiration is directed at groups or individuals perceived as legitimately high-status, competent, or warm, it tends to elicit deference and reduce political action, thereby maintaining existing social hierarchies. However, admiration for subversive figures, such as heroes or martyrs, can motivate political action that challenges the status quo.

== See also ==
- Adoration
- Attraction
- Awe
- Crush
- Dignity
- Envy
- Feeling
- Friendship
- Gratitude
- Infatuation
- Jealousy
- Love
- Moral emotions
- Narcissistic supply
- Passion
- Platonic love
- Resentment
- Respect
- Romance
- Social emotions
