= Wonder (emotion) =

Emotion comparable to surprise

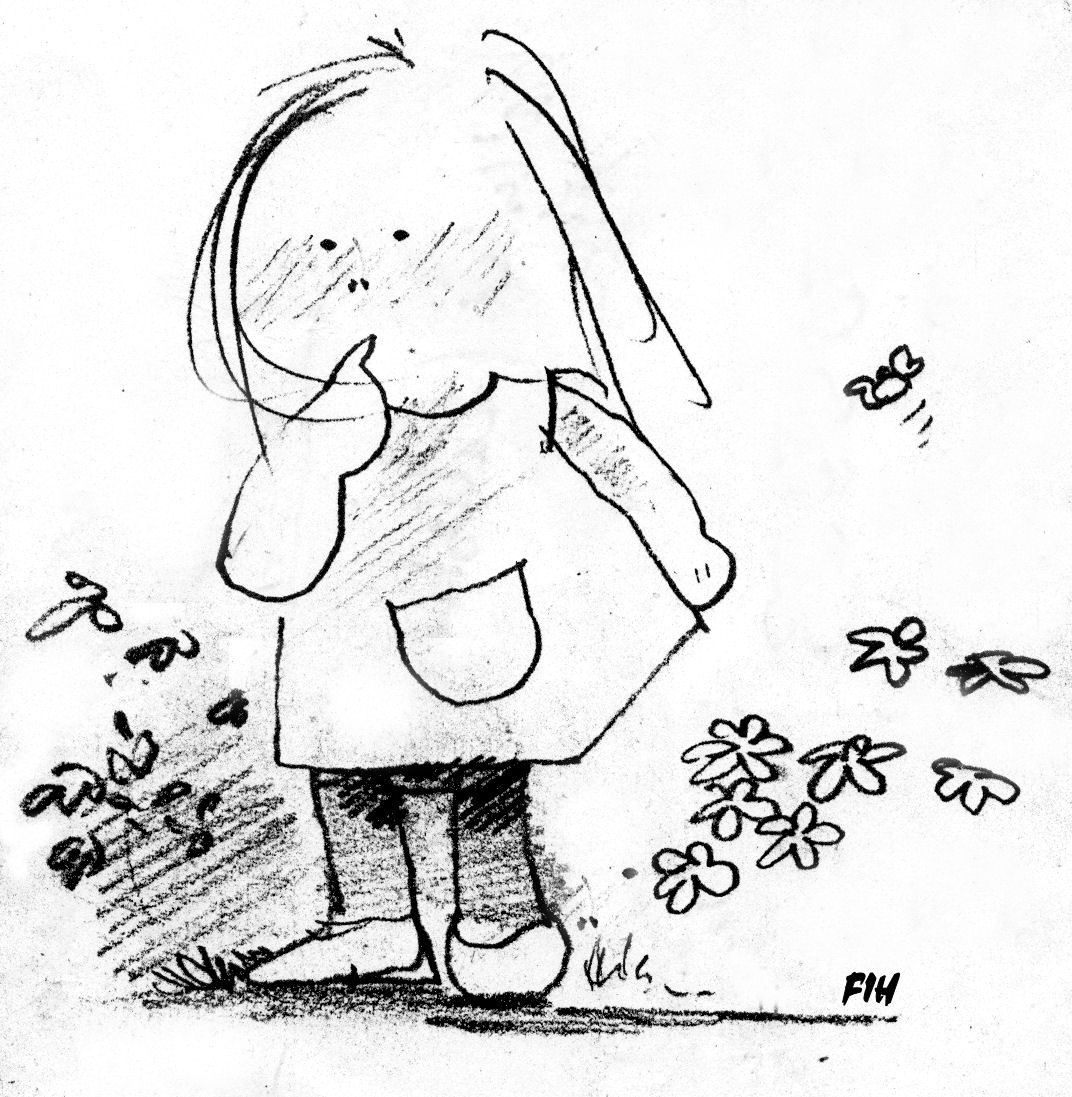
I wonder..., image (1978)

Wonder is an emotion comparable to surprise that people feel when perceiving something rare or unexpected (but not threatening). It has historically been seen as an important aspect of human nature, specifically being linked with curiosity and the drive behind intellectual exploration. Wonder is also often compared to the emotion of awe but awe implies fear or respect rather than joy. Science fiction can produce a "sense of wonder".

== Philosophical musings ==
The first philosophers to discuss the concept of wonder were Plato and Aristotle, who believed that it was the basis of the birth of philosophy.

French polymath René Descartes described admiration as one of the primary emotions because he claimed that emotions, in general, are reactions to unexpected phenomena. He noted that when people first encounter a surprising or new object that is "far different from what we knew before, or from what we supposed it should have been, we admire it, and are astonished at it." But Descartes, unlike the Greek philosophers before him, held a fundamentally negative view of admiration: "Although it is good to be born with some kind of inclination to this passion [admiration] because it disposes us to the acquisition of sciences, yet we ought afterwards to endeavor as much as we can to be rid of it."

This sentiment is reflected in other early modern authors like Thomas Hobbes in his discussion about the English words curiosity, joy and admiration. Hobbes argued that since "[...] whatsoever therefore happeneth new to a man, giveth him hope and matter of knowing somewhat that he knew not before", which creates "[...] hope and expectation of future knowledge from anything that happeneth new and strange", a "passion which we commonly call ADMIRATION; and the same considered as appetite, is called CURIOSITY, which is appetite for knowledge."

In De Homine XII, Hobbes discussed the "joy" of "admiration" again contrasting humans to other animals. Hobbes argues that "[...] this passion is almost peculiar to men." He pointed out that "even if other animals, whenever they behold something new or unusual, admire it as far as they behold something new or unusual" so that they can determine if it dangerous or harmless, men on the other hand, "when they see something new, seek to know whence it came and to what use they can put it."

In The History of Astronomy, Scottish 18th century economist and philosopher Adam Smith dwells on wonder not to explain the difference between human and animal thinking only, but rather to explain why we study natural science. An uncivilized person, or child, is still clearly different from other animals because "it beats the stone that hurts it". The child is concerned with finding an account of cause and effect, but it is limited in its ability to do so:

"But when law has established order and security, and subsistence ceases to be precarious, the curiosity of mankind is increased, and their fears are diminished. ... Wonder, therefore, and not any expectation of advantage from its discoveries, is the first principle which prompts mankind to the study of Philosophy, of that science which pretends to lay open the concealed connections that unite the various appearance of nature; and they pursue this study for its own sake, as an original pleasure or good in itself, without regarding its tendency to procure them the means of many other pleasures."

In Sartor Resartus, Thomas Carlyle closely associates wonder with his Transcendentalist concept of Natural Supernaturalism. Protagonist Diogenes Teufelsdröckh lambasts "Logic-choppers, and treble-pipe Scoffers, and professed Enemies to Wonder", namely proponents of scientism, and insists on "the necessity and high worth of universal Wonder", particularly in the religious sense: "'Wonder,' says he, 'is the basis of Worship: the reign of wonder is perennial, indestructible in Man; only at certain stages (as the present), it is, for some short season, a reign in partibus infidelium. ... 'The man who cannot wonder, who does not habitually wonder (and worship), ... is but a Pair of Spectacles behind which there is no Eye. Let those who have Eyes look through him, then he may be useful.'"

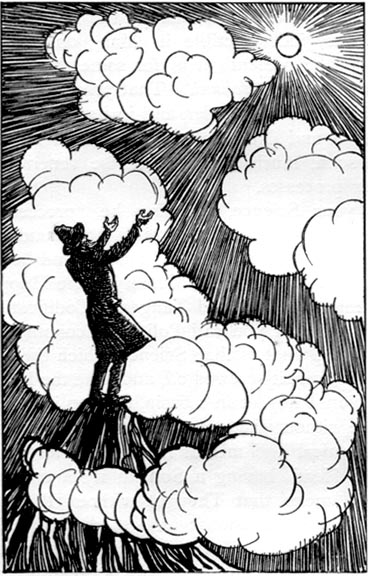
"Aspiration" by E. J. Sullivan, 1898 illustration for Thomas Carlyle's Sartor Resartus

In God in Search of Man, Abraham Joshua Heschel claims that wonder is a key emotion in living a worthy life. The attitude a religious person must take is, "This is the Lord's doing, it is marvelous in our eyes" (Psalms 118:23). Heschel insists that ultimate meaning can be sensed beyond a naturalistic understanding of natural phenomena, and that such meaning is mysterious and awe-inspiring.

In The Tangled Wing, Melvin Konner reviews the biologist's view of this pain and pleasure of learning. He notes that "If the problem is too unfamiliar, it will evoke attention; if it is difficult but doable, it will evoke interest, attention, and arousal and, when solved, it will evoke pleasure, often signalled by a smile" (p. 242). He says that "wonder" is "the hallmark of our species and the central feature of the human spirit".

== Bibliography ==
- Philip Fisher (1999). Wonder, The Rainbow, and the Aesthetics of Rare Experiences. London: Harvard University Press.
- Nicola Gess (2017). "Instruments of Wonder - Wondrous Instruments. Optical Devices in the Poetics of the Marvelous of Fontenelle, Rist, Breitinger, and Hoffmann". The German Quarterly (90/4): 407–422.
- Keltner, D.; Haidt, J. (2003). "Approaching awe, a moral, spiritual, and aesthetic emotion. Cognition and Emotion" (PDF). Cognition and Emotion (17): 297–314. doi:10.1080/02699930302297. PMID 29715721.
