= Kindness priming =

Cognitive effect

Kindness priming is an affect-dependent cognitive effect in which subjects will display a positive affect following exposure to kindness.

== Background ==
Kindness priming refers to the observed effect by which individuals who are exposed to an act of kindness – the priming – subsequently notice more of the positive features of the world than they would otherwise. A person receiving a free voucher from a stranger, for example, may become more inclined to perceive the intentions of others around them as good.

Some researchers hypothesize that kindness priming involves the same cognitive circuitry that enables memory priming. By activating neural representations of positive affect, an act of kindness stimulates increased activity in related associative networks. It is therefore more likely that subsequent stimuli will activate these related, positive networks, and so the positive affect continues to be carried forward in a feed forward manner. Additionally, kindness priming has also been shown to inoculate against negative stimuli in the short term, thus temporarily improving an individual's resilience.

== Effects ==
To measure the effects of kindness priming, investigators typically generate an experimental paradigm measuring behavioral reactions and cognitive self-reports. Often these tests include evaluation of additional effective primes, such as hostility. Typically, subjects are exposed to an effective prime or act of kindness, such as being given a box of candy, and subsequently given introspective tests measuring cognitive traits like affect, memory, learning, or attention. Some experiments include a behavioral observation instead, and often utilize paradigms from memory studies, such as learning time, reaction time, target identification, recall, and word generation.

The first attempt to identify kindness priming was derivative of a memory experiment performed by Teasdale and Fogarty in 1979. In their experiment, two mood states, happy and depressed, were generated in the participants at different trials. Participants were then presented with stimulus of either happy or sad emotional valence, and subsequently asked to recall the presented items. This study showed that in the happy state, participants were more likely to recall the happy stimuli, and vice versa for the depressed state.

== Hypothesis ==
Some researchers believe that kindness priming operates similarly to associative memories, and thus utilizes common neurological mechanisms. Teasdale and Fogarty were the first to hypothesize that affect led to differences in learning speed and memory retrieval, on the basis of congruent valence of mood and target material via common associations. Later, it was presumed that humans store material (including affect) in memory that later acts as cues for associative networks in the presence of novel environmental stimuli. These associative hypotheses were then refined to exclude opposing stimuli: specifically, Clark and Waddell postulated that the positive affect primed by acts of kindness causes a positive cognitive bias that leaves the subject relatively immune to "unambiguously unpleasant stimuli".

== Applications ==
Kindness priming is similar to general affect priming and thus has similar applications. In the field of positive psychology, kindness priming is a valuable tool for spreading positive affect in a feed forward cycle. By inducing a positive mood in others, and immunizing them against negative stimuli, it is believed that they will feel compelled to produce acts of kindness for others, propagating the effects. This spread of positive affect and increased resilience is in line with the goals of positive psychology and recommended therein to be pursued alongside loving-kindness meditation to improve general well-being. Marketing researchers have capitalized on kindness priming, as corporate studies have shown it may increase a subject's valence toward a brand.

== See also ==
- Elevation (emotion)
- Moral emotions
