= Moral emotions =

Emotions concerning morality

Moral emotions are a variety of social emotions that are involved in forming and communicating moral judgments and decisions, and in motivating behavioral responses to one's own and others' moral behavior. As defined by social psychologist Jonathan Haidt, moral emotions intrinsically "are linked to the interests or welfare either of a society as a whole or at least of persons other than the judge or agent". A person may not always have clear words to articulate the reasoning behind their moral position, yet simultaneously know it to be true.

Moral emotions are linked to a person's conscience - these are the emotions that make up a conscience and promote learning the difference between right and wrong, good and bad, virtuous and evil. Moral emotions include anger, disgust, contempt, shame, pride, guilt, compassion, gratitude, and elevation and help to provide people with the power and energy to do good and avoid doing bad. Some emotions, such as anger, can be triggered both in response to moralized and non-moralized stimuli, making them simultaneously moral and non-moral emotions, whereas other emotions, such as guilt and shame, seem to inherently have a moral component.

Academic conceptions of moral emotions have changed in recent years. A large part of moral emotions is based on society's interpretation of things. While it is true that many of these emotions are based on the absolute truths of morality, this is only but a part of what moral emotions are about. The full spectrum of what moral emotions entail also includes emotions based on the narratives of what people teach. Much of this leads people to make their own choices in life, through a process formally known as "moral decision-making". This is something that influences people every day, without most people ever even realizing it.

== Background ==
The study of morality through philosophy dates back at least as far as Plato and Aristotle, who believed morality derived from moral reasoning and focused their studies there at the expense of moral emotions. The emotive side of morality, worked by later philosophers such as Adam Smith in his The Theory of Moral Sentiments and David Hume had been looked upon with disdain, as subservient to the higher, rational, moral reasoning. This continued even when the field of moral psychology evolved from moral philosophy, with scholars like Immanuel Kant, Piaget and Kohlberg touting moral reasoning as the key factor determining morality. Kohlberg's work on the cognition underlying morality especially was part of the larger "cognitive revolution" movement within psychology. However, beginning in the 1970s there has been a rise in a new front of research: moral emotions as the basis for moral behavior. This development began with a focus on empathy and guilt, but has since moved on to encompass new emotional scholarship on emotions such as anger, shame, disgust, awe, and elevation. With the new research, theorists have begun to question whether or not moral emotions might hold a larger role in determining morality, one that might even surpass that of moral reasoning.

== Definitions ==
There have generally been two approaches taken by philosophers to define moral emotion, with the first approach being "to specify the formal conditions that make a moral statement (e.g., that is prescriptive, that it is universalizeable, and that it overrides nonmoral concerns, such as expedience)". This first approach is more tied to language and the definitions given to moral emotions. The second approach "is to specify the material conditions of a moral issue, for example, that moral rules and judgments 'must bear on the interest or welfare either of society as a whole or at least of persons other than the judge or agent'". This definition seems to be more action-based. It focuses on the outcome of a moral emotion. The second definition is more preferred because it is not tied to language and therefore can be applied to prelinguistic children and animals. Moral emotions are "emotions that are linked to the interests or welfare either of society as a whole or at least of persons other than the judge or agent."

== Types of moral emotion ==
Moral emotions, like any emotion, fall under categories of positive and negative. With moral emotions, however, there are two types of negative: inner-directed negative emotions (which motivate people to act ethically) and outer-directed negative emotions (which aim to discipline or punish). Within the positive and negative categories, there are specific emotions. Examples of positive moral emotions are gratitude, elevation, and pride in one's beneficial successes. Examples of negative moral emotions include shame, guilt, and embarrassment.

There is a debate whether there is a set of basic emotions or if there are "scripts or set of components that can be mixed and matched, allowing for a very large number of possible emotions". Even those arguing for a basic set acknowledge that there are variants of each emotion (psychologist Paul Ekman calls these variants "families"). According to Jonathan Haidt:

The principal moral emotions can be divided into two large and two small joint families. The large families are the "other-condemning" family, in which the three brothers are contempt, anger, and disgust (and their many children, such as indignation and loathing), and the "self-conscious" family (shame, embarrassment, and guilt)…[T]he two smaller families the "other-suffering" family (compassion) and the "other-praising" family (gratitude and elevation).

Haidt would suggest that the higher the emotionality of a moral agent, the more likely the agent is to act morally. He uses the term "disinterested elicitor" to describe an event or situation that provokes emotions in us, even when these emotions do not have anything to do with our own personal welfare. It is these elicitors that cause people to participate in what he calls "prosocial action tendencies" (actions that benefit society). Haidt explains moral emotions as "emotion families", in which each family contains emotions that may be similar although not exactly the same. These moral emotions are provoked by eliciting events that often lead to prosocial action tendencies. Each person's likelihood of prosocial action is determined by his or her degree of emotionality.

Morality and the emotions that come with it have been categorized into an underlying two-dimensional structure. It consists of two components, the first dimension being valence, which is the help/harm framework. The second dimension is moral type, which is the agent/patient framework. These components correspond to the moral event, whether helping or harming, and the exemplars involved, which would be the agent or the patient. Each quadrant illustrates how moral events can have distinct moral emotions attached to them based on the exemplar involved. In the agent/help quadrant, moral emotions such as inspiration and elevation are elicited by heroes. In the patient/help quadrant, emotions of relief and happiness are elicited by beneficiaries. In the agent/harm quadrant, emotions like anger and disgust are elicited by villains. And in the patient/harm section, emotions of sympathy and sadness are elicited by victims. This structure explains how moral emotions can be shaped by the relationship between the morality of the exemplar and the morality of the act.

== Moral emotions and behavior ==
=== Empathy and altruism ===
Empathy also plays a large role in altruism. The empathy-altruism hypothesis states that feelings of empathy for another lead to an altruistic motivation to help that person. In contrast, there may also be an egoistic motivation to help someone in need. This is the Hullian tension-reduction model in which personal distress caused by another in need leads the person to help in order to alleviate their own discomfort. The Altruism Born of Suffering Literature states that individuals who have undergone difficult times and grown from this trauma identify with seeing others in need and respond altruistically by protecting or caring for others. In the context of climate change, it is recognised that for individuals to act altruistically towards their society and environment, they need to learn to increase their capacity to process their emotional experiences as well as increased reflective functioning.

Batson, Klein, Highberger, and Shaw conducted experiments where they manipulated people through the use of empathy-induced altruism to make decisions that required them to show partiality to one individual over another. The first experiment involved a participant from each group choosing someone to experience a positive or negative task. These groups included a non-communication, communication/low-empathy, and communication/high-empathy. They were asked to make their decisions based on these standards resulting in the communication/high-empathy group showing more partiality in the experiment than the other groups due to being successfully manipulated emotionally. Those individuals who they successfully manipulated reported that despite feeling compelled in the moment to show partiality, they still felt they had made the more "immoral" decision since they followed an empathy-based emotion rather than adhering to a justice perspective of morality.

Batson, Klein, Highberger, and Shaw conducted two experiments on empathy-induced altruism, proposing that this can lead to actions that violate the justice principle. The second experiment operated similarly to the first, using low-empathy and high-empathy groups. Participants were faced with the decision to move an ostensibly ill child to an "immediate help" group versus leaving her on a waiting list after listening to her emotionally-driven interview describing her condition and the life it has left her to lead. Those who were in the high-empathy group were more likely than those in the low-empathy group to move the child higher up the list to receive treatment earlier. When these participants were asked what the more moral choice was, they agreed that the more moral choice would have been to not move this child ahead of the list at the expense of the other children. In this case, it is evident that when empathy-induced altruism is at odds with what is seen as moral, oftentimes empathy-induced altruism has the ability to win out over morality.

Recently neuroscientist Jean Decety, drawing on empirical research in evolutionary theory, developmental psychology, social neuroscience, and psychopathy, argued that empathy and morality are neither systematically opposed to one another, nor inevitably complementary. Research has also investigated the relationship between psychopathy and the presence of moral emotions.

=== Moral emotions in humans and other animals ===
Haidt speaks of "cognitively simpler forms or precursors that can be seen in other animals," but notes that moral emotions seem to predominantly affect humans as compared to other animals. He writes that "[t]he puzzle of the moral emotions is that Homo sapiens, far more than any other animal, appears to devote a considerable portion of its emotional life to reacting to social events that do not directly affect the self."

"Most social animals, however are doomed to size up interaction partners by themselves. If vampire bat A fails to share a blood meal with vampire bat B, after bat B shared with bat A, bat b does not go around to bats C, D, and E to warn them away from future interactions with bat A. Among human beings. however, this is exactly what happens. Language and highly developed social-cognitive abilities allow human beings to keep track of the reputations of hundreds of individuals (Dunbar, 1996). In endless hours of gossip, people work together to catch cheaters. liars. hypocrites. and others who are trying to fake the appearance of being reliable interaction partners. Human beings, then, live in a rich moral world of reputations and third-party concerns. We care what people do to each other, and we readily develop negative feelings toward individuals with whom we have never interacted."

=== Other behavioral findings ===
Emmons (2009) defines gratitude as a natural emotional reaction and a universal tendency to respond positively to another's benevolence. Gratitude is motivating and leads to what Emmons' describes as "upstream reciprocity". This is the passing on of benefits to third parties instead of returning benefits to one's benefactors.

In the context of social networking behavior, research from Brady, Wills, Jost, Tucker, and Van Bavel (2017) shows that the expression of moral emotion amplifies the extent to which moral and political ideals are disseminated in social media platforms. Analyzing a large sample of Twitter communications on polarizing issues, such as gun control, same-sex marriage, and climate change, results indicated that the presence of moral-emotional language in messages increased their transmission by approximately 20% per word, compared to purely-moral and purely-emotional language.

== See also ==
- Conscience
- Emotion
- Love
- Kama muta
- Kindness priming (psychology)
- Moral psychology
- Mudita (sympathetic or vicarious joy)
- Pity
- Rage
- Remorse
- Resentment
- Righteous indignation
- Schadenfreude
- Self-conscious emotions
- Social intuitionism
- Somatic marker hypothesis
- Sympathy
