= Self-conscious emotions =

Emotions that require a sense of self

Self-conscious emotions, such as guilt, shame, embarrassment, and pride, are a variety of social emotions that relate to an individuals sense of self and their consciousness of others' reactions to the individual.

== Description ==
During the second year of life, new emotions begin to emerge when children gain the understanding that they themselves are entities distinct from other people and begin to develop a sense of self. These emotions include:

- Shame
- Pride
- Guilt
- Envy
- Embarrassment

Self-conscious emotions have been shown to have social benefits. These include areas such as reinforcing social behaviors and reparation of social errors. There is also possible research suggesting that a lack of self-conscious emotion is a contributing cause of maladaptive behaviour.

They have five distinct features that differentiate them from other emotions:

- Require self-awareness and self representation
- Emerge later than basic emotions
- Facilitate attainment of complex social goals
- Do not have distinct universally recognized facial expressions
- Cognitively complex

== Development ==
Self-conscious emotions are among the latter of emotions to develop. Two reasons are at the cause of this:

=== Body language ===
Emotions such as joy, fear and sadness can all be gathered reliantly on just a person’s face. However self-conscious emotions heavily involve the body in addition to the face (Darwin, 1965). For this reason, self conscious emotions are more difficult for people to learn and understand.

=== Self-awareness ===
Due to the nature of these emotions, they can only begin to form once an individual has the capacity to self-evaluate their own actions. If the individual decides that they have caused a situation to occur, they then must decide if the situation was a success or a failure based on the social norms they have accrued, then attach the appropriate self-conscious feeling (Weiner, 1986). This is a complex cognitive skill, one that takes time to master.

== Biological complexity ==
As stated, self-conscious emotions are complex and harder to learn than basic emotions such as happiness or fear. This premise also has biological backing.

=== Frontotemporal lobar degeneration ===
Frontotemporal lobar degeneration (FTLD) is a neurodegenerative disease that attacks the brain selectively in the frontal lobe, temporal lobe and amygdala. Patients suffering from FTLD offer information on the biological complexity involved in generating self-conscious emotions. With the use of a startle experiment (where patients and control participants are exposed to an unexpected and loud sound) it has been shown that sufferers of FTLD show and experience the basic negative emotions expected to be attached to the startling sounds. However they show significantly less signs of experiencing self-conscious emotions compared to control groups. This is due to an inhibition of embarrassment caused by the damaged brain (Sturm & Rosen, 2006).

The ability to show basic emotions while lacking the ability to perform the more complex self-conscious emotions demonstrates that self-conscious emotions are biologically harder to perform than average emotions. FTLD patients tend to struggle in social situations (Sturm & Rosen, 2006). This is again linked with their inability to perform self-conscious emotions adequately.

== Social benefits ==
Acquiring the ability to perform self-conscious emotions may be relatively difficult, but does bring benefits. The main benefits being those of social harmony and social healing.

=== Social harmony ===
Self-conscious emotions are seen to promote social harmony in different ways. The first is its ability to reinforce social norms. It does this in a very similar way to that of operant conditioning. Performing well in situations while keeping to social norms can elicit pride. This feels good so therefore encourages the behaviour to be repeated. Equally performing in a situation while not sticking to the social norms can leave individuals feeling embarrassed. This feels bad and is generally avoided in the future. An example of this is a study (Brown, 1970) where participants were shown to choose avoiding feelings of embarrassment over financial gains.

=== Social healing ===
Self-conscious emotions enable social healing. When an individual makes a social error, feelings of guilt or embarrassment changes not just the person’s mood but their body language. In this situation the individual gives out non-verbal signs of submission and this is generally more likely to be greeted with forgiveness. This has been shown in a study where actors knocked over a supermarket shelve (Semin & Manstead, 1982). Those that acted embarrassed were received more favorably than those who reacted in a neutral fashion.

- Levels of embarrassment have found to be easier to see in females and African-Americans, than compared to male and Caucasian targets (Keltner, 1995). This is due to social learnings from previous generations.

== Poor behaviour ==
Initially, self-conscious emotions were looked upon as troublesome and all part of an internal fight. However, views on this have now changed. There is a strong link between the ability of an individual to regulate their behaviour in an appropriate manner and problems with their self-conscious emotions. A school was able to list a set of boys who were classified as ‘prone to aggression and delinquent behaviour’. When these boys sat an interactive IQ test, they scored higher on scores of anger compared with other boys at the school. They also scored lower in feelings of embarrassment (Keltner, 1995).

Caution should be taken with regard to these studies. While the findings are becoming more robust, the number of different variables involved will make it hard to ever come to a conclusion on the subject of maladaptive behaviour being caused by these deficiencies. The difficulty being the hardship of creating the proper environment within a lab where self-conscious emotions would not only occur, but could be adequately measured.

== See also ==
- Attention
- Developmental psychology
- Moral emotions
- Psychological repression
- Self-consciousness
- Self-esteem
- Self-pity
- Thought suppression
