= Kama muta =

Emotion akin to being moved

Kama muta (Sanskrit: काममूत 'moved by love') is an emotion described by expressions such as 'being moved', 'heart-warming', 'stirring', or 'being emotionally touched'. It is a primarily positive emotion which is experienced as a feeling of buoyancy, security and warmth in the chest, and may be accompanied with goosebumps or tears. Kama muta is felt when one observes or engages in events which cause a deepened sense of equivalence or oneness with others, and motivates devotion to those relationships. Kama muta is considered to have the evolutionary function of facilitating the devotion, commitment and connection necessary for human social union.

== Background and overview ==
As early as the end of the 19th century, scholarly discussion has occurred over the existence and importance of the emotional experience often described in English as 'being moved'. The theory behind kama muta represents a surge in systematized research on the experience in the 21st century, influenced in large part by the work of Alan Fiske.

The scientific term 'kama muta' was coined as to help identify and describe the emotion between cultures and languages. Kama muta is taken to unify the experience, which is denoted by different vernacular lexemes across languages. For example, an English speaker saying that they feel moved, a Mandarin speaker saying that they feel gǎndòng (感动) and a Norwegian person saying that they feel rørt, are all taken to be saying that they are experiencing kama muta.

Kama muta has a multifaceted definition based on "appraisals, valence, bodily sensations [and] motivation", which has allowed for research to be conducted on the emotion in many different countries and languages across the globe. In this manner, the theory behind kama muta has addressed some of the ontological and epistemological challenges with identifying, characterising and measuring emotions scientifically.

== The kama muta model ==
=== Assumptions ===
As there is no scientific consensus on how we should classify emotions, emotion theories operate on assumptions about how emotions can be identified, characterised and measured. Fiske, Schubert and Seibt outline that the kama muta model operates on two central assumptions:

1. That the experience of emotion is facilitated through internal apparatuses shaped by our evolution, which are universal.
2. That emotional experiences can be categorized, distinguished and measured through a unique footprint of changes in our subjective phenomenological and objective physiological experience.

=== Causes and functions ===
Kama muta is considered to be facilitated by evolutionary reasons, due to its expected role in interpersonal relationships. Specifically, kama muta is considered to be related to communal sharing relations, one of the four fundamental categories of social relations described in relational models theory. Communal sharing relations are those in which individuals are brought to the perception of their equivalence, or oneness with a set of individuals under a common and equalizing characteristic, or feature. Individuals in communal sharing relations feel compassion towards each other, and are motivated by a sense of devotion towards their common identity.

It is predicted that kama muta occurs when individuals either engage in, or simply observe an event which causes a "sudden intensification" of their perception of communal sharing relations. This may take the form of (but is not limited to) engaging in or observing acts of great compassion, of closeness and intimacy, or of cooperation and harmony.

=== Measurement ===
The kama muta model framework incorporates many of the characteristic elements which are considered to constitute the experience, including: the reported valence of the emotion, its common physiological symptoms, its effect on motivations, the typical appraisal made of eliciting stimuli, and the typical vernacular lexemes used to describe the experience in different cultures and languages. This multi-faceted definition of kama muta enables operationalization and measurement in different cultures across the globe. Typically this has occurred through the presentation of videos thought to induce kama muta, followed by a questionnaire that has been translated to meaningfully suit the culture it occurs in.

Kama muta is thought to have occurred when an individual reports an emotional experience that: is positive, is accompanied by such bodily sensations as tears or goosebumps, is felt in response to an increase in communal sharing relations, causes a motivation to share and intensify their communal sharing relations with others and is referred to using vernacular approximately meaning 'being moved'. As kama muta can be experienced without the presence of some of these elements, research has been aimed at specifying the necessary elements and thresholds required to categorise the experience.
