= Hoarding =

Intentional accumulation of items for later use

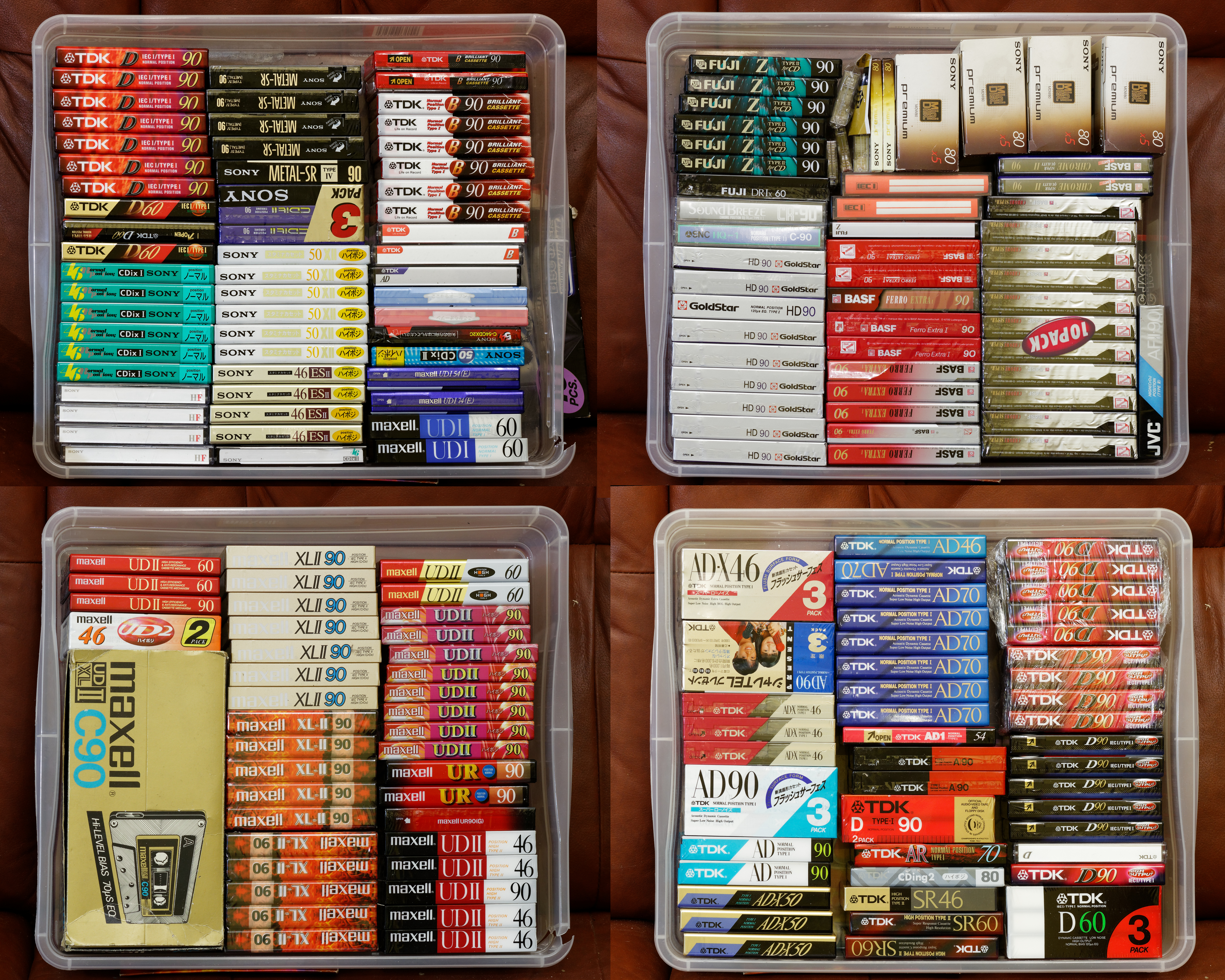
Tape hoarding

Hoarding is the act of engaging in excessive acquisition of items that are not needed or for which no space is available. Hoarding can also be defined as collecting and holding otherwise scarce items. Some items commonly hoarded include coins considered to have an intrinsic value, such as those minted in silver, or gold, as well as collectibles, jewelry, precious metals and other luxuries.

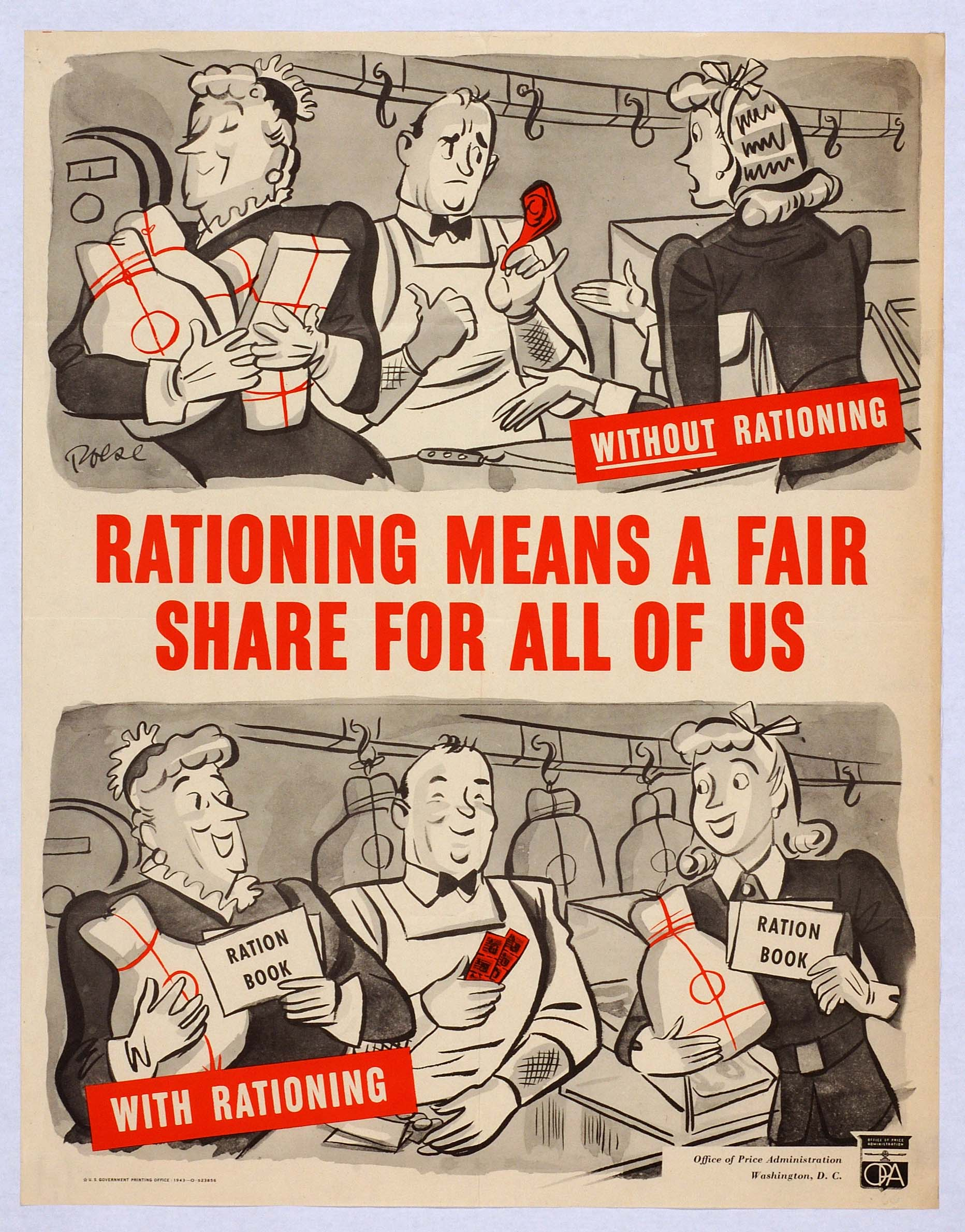
An anti-hoarding, pro-rationing poster from the United States in World War II

== History ==
The first documented case of hoarding was in the Collyer Mansion by the brothers Homer and Langley in 1947, New York. Their mansion became an attraction in 1938 because of the extreme level of accumulation and fortune found in their residence after their deaths.

== Anxiety ==
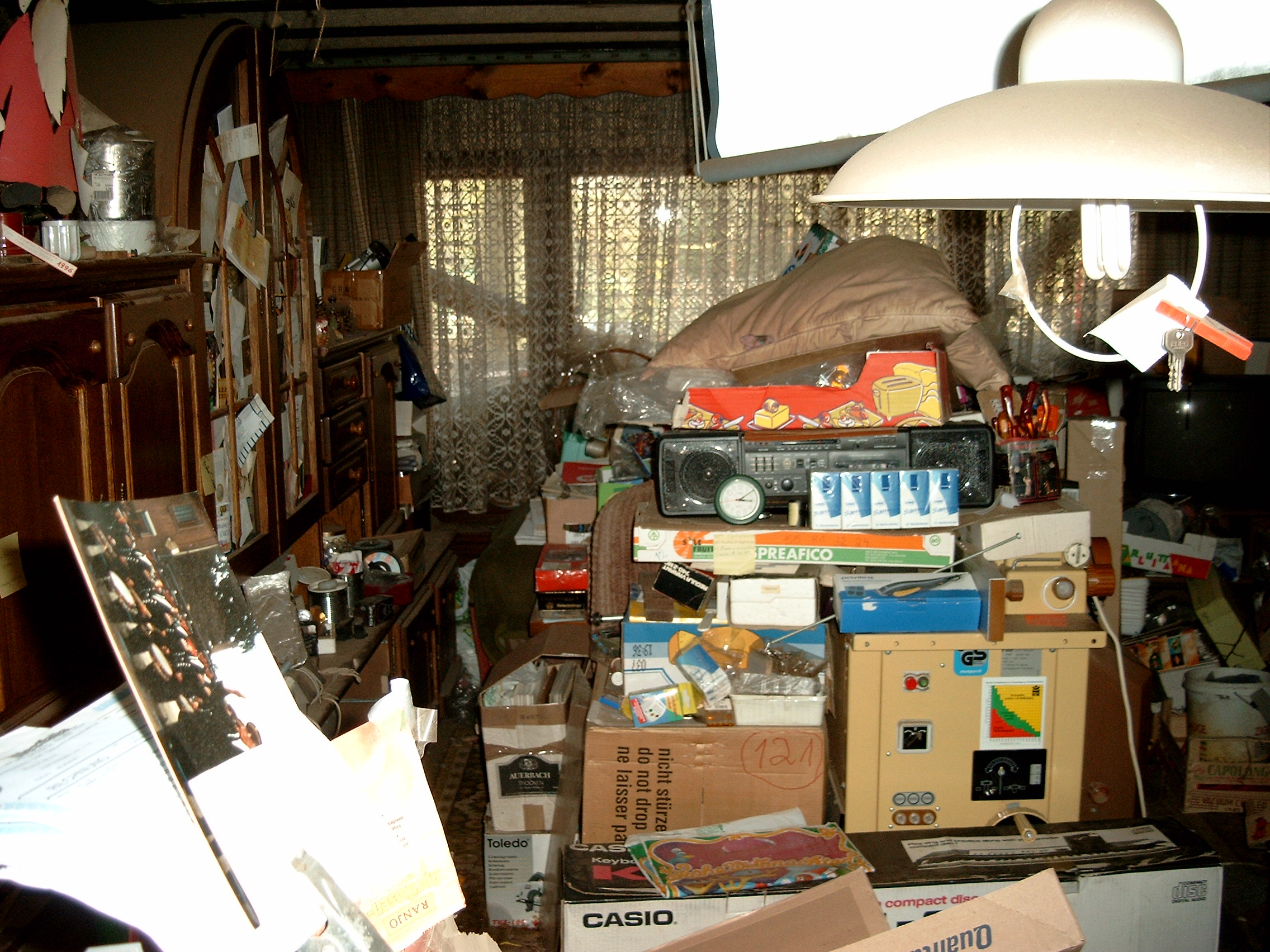
Apartment of a compulsive hoarder

Individuals who meet the diagnostic criteria for hoarding disorder experience feelings of anxiety or discomfort about discarding possessions they do not need. This discomfort arises from an emotional attachment to possessions and a strong belief that their possessions will be needed in the future. Possessions will take on a sentimental value that outweighs their functional value. This is no different from someone without hoarding disorder; the difference lies in the strength of this sentimental value and in how many items take on sentimental value. For this reason, when discarding items, hoarders may feel as though they were throwing away a part of themselves.

In severe cases, a house may become a fire hazard (due to blocked exits and stacked papers) or a health hazard (due to vermin infestation, excreta and detritus from excessive pets, hoarded food and garbage, or the risk of stacks of items collapsing on the occupants and blocking exit routes). Thus, hoarding affects more than just the owner of the objects, as the state of a hoarded house can have a negative effect on all occupants and even neighbors. Furthermore, individuals with hoarding disorder may have a quality of life as poor as those diagnosed with schizophrenia. Eventually, the disorder increases family strain, work impairment, and the risk of serious medical conditions.

Hoarding disorder begins at an average age of 13 years old. The general consensus is that men and women are equally prone to hoarding. Hoarding can run in families, and it may be possible that genetics plays a role in developing hoarding behaviors. Also, this behavior can be developed due to life circumstances such as difficult losses, depression and financial crises which make it difficult for people to discard their belongings.

According to the Diagnostic and Statistical Manual of Mental Disorders, the criteria for hoarding disorder boil down to five main points. First, the hoarder experiences difficulty parting with items regardless of the item's value. Second, the hoarder feels a need to save items, and when they do part with them, it leads to strong distress. This, in turn, leads to objects cluttering the home to the point that living is compromised and rooms cannot be used for their intended purposes. If the house has not fallen into such a state, it is only because of outside parties intervening. Fourth, the hoarding has compromised the hoarder's life in a clinically significant way, including an inability to maintain a safe living environment. Fifth, the diagnosis is only given if another psychological diagnosis does not fit better and there is no physiological reason to explain the hoarding. For an exact quote of the diagnostic criteria, the Diagnostic and Statistical Manual of Mental Disorders is available to the public.

In DSM-IV, hoarding was listed as a symptom of obsessive-compulsive personality disorder and obsessive-compulsive disorder; however, it was found that hoarding has a relatively weak connection with OCD or OCPD compared to other symptoms. Because of this, hoarding was designated in DSM-5 as a separate disorder. However, hoarding is often found alongside OCD. It has been discovered that patients with OCD who exhibit hoarding symptoms show a specific form of hoarding, where they are more likely to hoard "bizarre items" and perform compulsive rituals associated with their hoarding behaviors, such as rituals of checking items or rituals that must be completed before discarding them.

Approximately 2.6% of the population suffer from hoarding disorder, although some studies suggest that lifetime prevalence may reach up to 14%.

The frequency of hoarding cases increases significantly with age, and individuals over the age of 54 are three times more likely to meet the criteria for hoarding disorder. However, hoarding symptoms typically manifest in early childhood and intensify to clinically significant levels by middle age. More than half of the individuals suffering from hoarding report that the onset of hoarding was associated with a traumatic life event, and in this group, the age of onset of hoarding is significantly higher. Epidemiological studies have shown that the tendency to hoard is twice as common in men, although clinical studies on hoarding tendency are usually conducted predominantly with female participants. This suggests that male hoarders are significantly less studied and receive inadequate treatment.

According to some studies, anthropomorphism, or the propensity to attribute human characteristics to non-human items, has been associated with hoarding. Additionally, the findings stated that younger individuals had more substantial hoarding and anthropomorphizing cognitions and behaviors, and women demonstrated stronger early anthropomorphizing behaviors compared to men.

=== Treatment ===
There are no medications currently approved by the Food and Drug Administration for treating the symptoms of hoarding. Although, some medications, such as selective serotonin reuptake inhibitors (SSRIs) and serotonin/norepinephrine reuptake inhibitors (SNRIs), can be used off-label for individuals diagnosed with hoarding disorder.

The primary treatment for hoarding disorder is individual psychotherapy. In particular, cognitive behavior therapy is regarded as the gold standard for treating the disorder.

== In literature ==
In the Divine Comedy, those who hoard are depicted as sinners locked in eternal battle with wasters. Overseen by Pluto (the former god of wealth now turned into a demon and who speaks in gibberish), they have to push heavy boulders (representing money) in opposite directions. Each time the two lines of sinners meet they accuse and insult each other. The hoarders and wasters have been condemned to Hell for being unable to practice moderation with money.

In William Shakespeare's play Coriolanus, Caius Marcius and his followers hoard grain, only sharing it with those they deem worthy.

== See also ==
- Collecting
- Digital hoarding
- Hoard (archaeological)
- Hoarding (economics)
- Panic buying
- Plyushkin, fictional Russian hoarder, after which compulsive hoarding is sometimes known as "Plyushkin's disorder"
- Psychology of collecting
- Hoarding (animal behavior)
