= Alan Fiske =

American professor of anthropology

- Born: Alan Page Fiske; 1947 (age 78–79); United States
- Education: Harvard University (BA); University of Chicago (MA, PhD)
- Known for: Social relationship theories
- Scientific career
- Fields: Anthropology
- Workplaces: University of California, Los Angeles
- Thesis: Making Up Society: Four Models for Constructing Social Relations Among the Moose of Burkina Faso (1985)

Alan Page Fiske (born 1947) is an American professor of anthropology at the University of California, Los Angeles, known for studying the nature of human relationships and cross-cultural variations between them.

== Early life and education ==
Fiske was born in 1947. His father, Donald W. Fiske, was a professor of psychology at the University of Chicago. His sister, Susan Fiske, is a social psychologist who is the Eugene Higgins Professor of Psychology and Public Affairs at Princeton University.

Fiske earned a bachelor's degree, cum laude, in social relations from Harvard College in 1968. He went on to earn a master's degree in 1973 and a Ph.D. in 1985, both from the University of Chicago, focusing on cross-cultural problems and human development. Between earning degrees, Fiske worked as a director and consultant to the Peace Corps in Bangladesh and Upper Volta, and as consultant to USAID for the Central African Republic.

== Career ==
Fiske held various professorships at the University of Pennsylvania, UCSD, Swarthmore College, and Bryn Mawr College, before obtaining a full professorship at UCLA in 2002. There he is former director of the Center for Behavior, Evolution, and Culture, and of the Center for Culture, Brain, and Development. His areas of research interest include psychological anthropology, social relationships, and theories of violence. Fiske is the author of Relational Models Theory and, with Tage Rai, the author of Virtuous Violence Theory - the idea that violence is largely motivated by the evolved social relations models which underlie moral behavior in Fiske's theory, and that this violence is therefore experienced as justified by the perpetrators in the same way that forceful opposition to perpetrators of violence is perceived as laudable and moral.

== Publications ==
- Virtuous Violence with Tage Shakti Rai (2015). Cambridge: Cambridge University Press.
- Structures of Social Life: The Four Elementary Forms of Human Relations (1991). New York: Free Press (Macmillan).
- Fiske, A.P.; Haslam, N. (1996). "Social Cognition Is Thinking About Relationships". Current Directions in Psychological Science. 5 (5): 143–148. doi:10.1111/1467-8721.ep11512349. S2CID 144754833.
- Fiske, A.P.; Haslam, N. (1997). "Is Obsessive-Compulsive Disorder of Pathology of the Human Disposition to Perform Socially Meaningful Rituals? Evidence of Similar Content". Journal of Nervous and Mental Disease. 185 (4): 211–222. doi:10.1097/00005053-199704000-00001. PMID 9114806.
- A.P. Fiske, S. Kitayama, H. Markus, & D. Nisbett 1997. "The Cultural Matrix of Social Psychology". In Handbook of Social Psychology, 4th Ed. Gilber, S. Fiske, & G. Lindzey, Eds. pp. 915–981. New York: McGraw Hill.
- Fiske, A (2000). "Complementarity Theory: Why Human Social Capacities Evolved to Require Cultural Complements". Personality and Social Psychology Review. 4 (1): 76–94. doi:10.1207/s15327957pspr0401_7. PMID 15710561. S2CID 14773286.
- Iacoboni, M.; Lieberman, M. D.; Knowlton, B. J.; Molnar-Szakacs, I.; Moritz, M.; Throop, J.; Fiske, A. P. (2004). "Watching Social Interactions Produces Dorsomedial Prefrontal and Medial Parietal BOLD fMRI Signal Increases Compared to a Resting Baseline". NeuroImage. 21 (3): 1167–1173. doi:10.1016/j.neuroimage.2003.11.013. PMID 15006683. S2CID 7186842.
- "Four Modes of Constituting Relationships: Consubstantial Assimilation; Space, Magnitude, Time and Force; Concrete Procedures; Abstract Symbolism" (2004) In N. Haslam, Ed., Relational Models Theory: A Contemporary Overview. Mahwah, NJ: Erlbaum.
- Rai, Tage; Fiske, A. P. (2011). "Moral Psychology is Relationship Regulation: Moral Motives for Unity, Hierarchy, Equality, and Proportionality". Psychological Review. 118 (1): 57–75. doi:10.1037/a0021867. PMID 21244187.
- Nettle, Daniel; Panchanathan, Karthik; Rai, Tage; Fiske, A. P. (2011). "The Evolution of Giving, Sharing, and Lotteries". Current Anthropology. 52 (5): 747–756. doi:10.1086/661521. S2CID 51686966.
- Fiske, A (2011). "Metarelational Models: Configurations of Social Relationships". European Journal of Social Psychology. 42: 2–18. doi:10.1002/ejsp.847.
