= Awe =

Emotion comparable to wonder

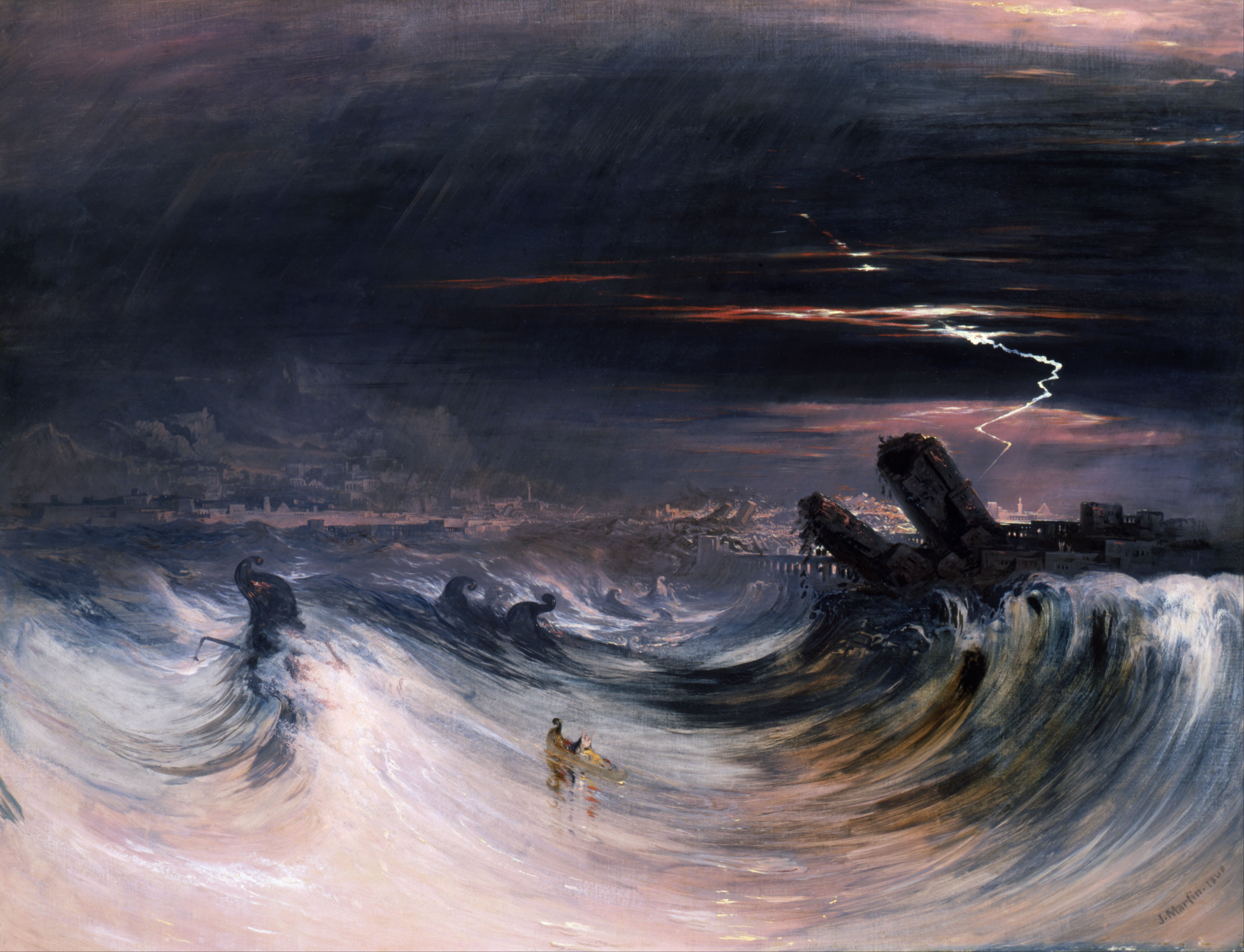
Destruction of Tyre by John Martin (1840)

Awe is an emotion comparable to wonder but less joyous. On Robert Plutchik's wheel of emotions awe is modeled as a combination of surprise and fear. Keltner and Haidt, in a highly-cited paper, describe it as 'In the upper reaches of pleasure and on the boundary of fear'.

In general, awe is directed at objects considered to be more powerful than the subject, such as the Great Pyramid of Giza, the Grand Canyon, the vastness of the cosmos, or a deity.

== Definitions ==
Awe is difficult to define, and as Katz and Franz point out, there is 'very little scientific knowledge about differences in awe across various languages, cultures, and time periods'.

Keltner and Haidt describe awe as an 'epistemic emotion', one which arises when our encounters with the world that lie outside our cognitive schemas cause us to reflect on, or even to reappraise our knowledge and beliefs. Other epistemic emotions include wonder, admiration, elevation, and the sublime. They regard the necessary qualities of awe as "perceived vastness" and "need for accommodation" in shifting one's mentality regarding the world and deviating from one's usual frame of reference. Accommodation refers to the Piagetian concept, and refers to experience that require us to modify the schemas with which we see and interact with the world. While their use of vastness as a necessary quality has been influential, more recent writers have argued that it is not so, and that its inclusion in the definition of awe has caused a neglect of the full range of awe-provoking experiences.

In his phenomenological study Awe: The Delights and Dangers of Our Eleventh Emotion, neuropsychologist Paul Pearsall defines awe as an "overwhelming and bewildering sense of connection with a startling universe that is usually far beyond the narrow band of our consciousness." Pearsall sees awe as the 11th emotion, beyond those now scientifically accepted (i.e., love, fear, sadness, embarrassment, curiosity, pride, enjoyment, despair, guilt, and anger)."

Most definitions allow for awe to be a positive or negative experience, but when asked to describe events that elicit awe, most people only cite positive experiences.

== Etymology ==
The term awe stems from the Old English word ege, meaning "terror, dread, awe," which may have arisen from the Greek word áchos, meaning "pain." The word awesome originated from the word awe in the late 16th century, to mean "filled with awe." The word awful also originated from the word awe, to replace the Old English word egeful ("dreadful").

== Theories ==
=== Evolutionary theories ===
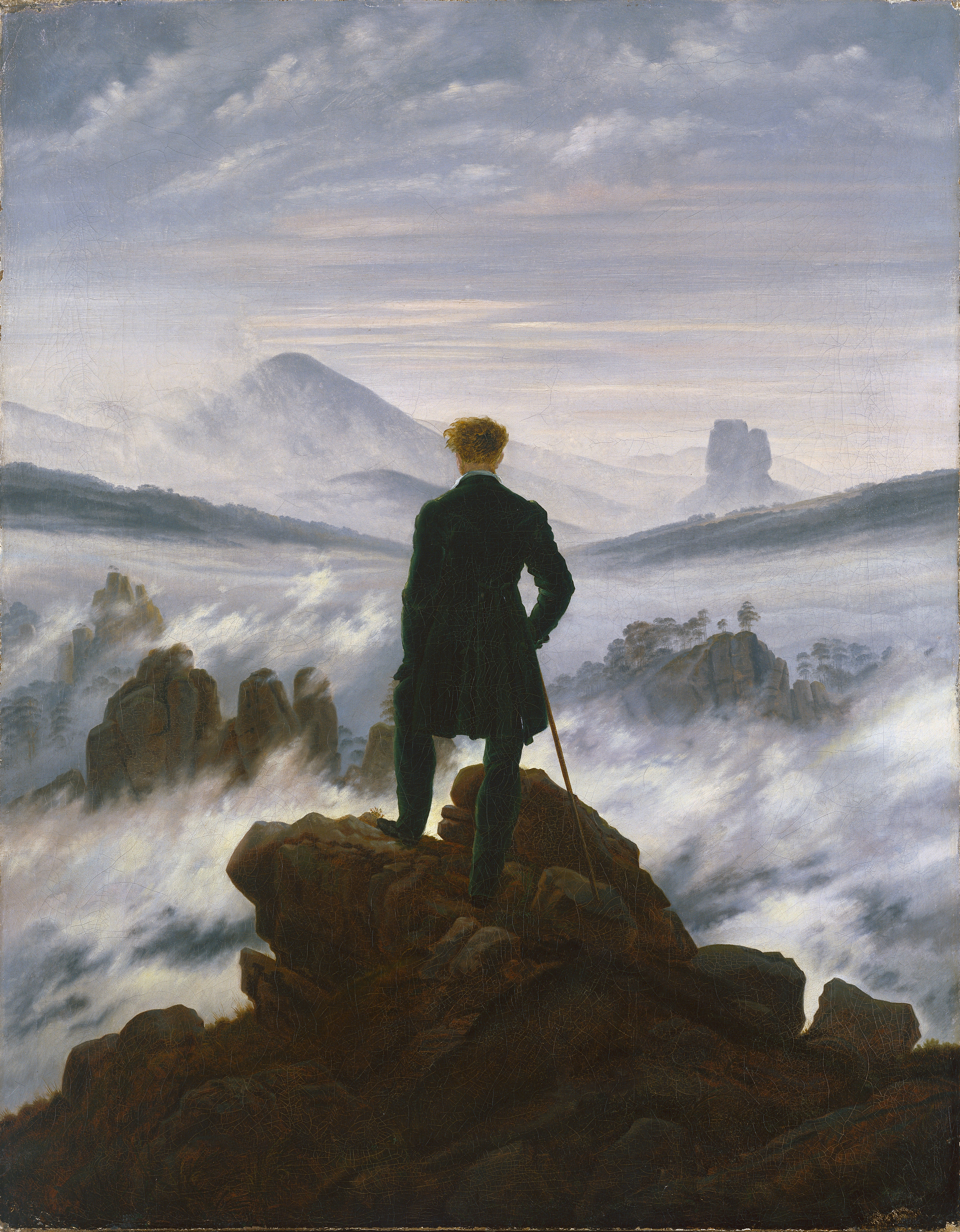
Wanderer above the Sea of Fog (1818) by German Romantic landscape painter Caspar David Friedrich

==== Awe reinforces social hierarchies ====
Keltner and Haidt proposed an evolutionary explanation for awe. They suggested that the current emotion of awe originated from feelings of primordial awe – a hard-wired response that low-status individuals felt in the presence of more powerful, high-status individuals, which would have been adaptive by reinforcing social hierarchies. This primordial awe would have occurred only when the high-status person had characteristics of vastness (in size, fame, authority, or prestige) that required the low-status individual to engage in Piagetian accommodation (changing one's mental representation of the world to accommodate the new experience).

Keltner and Haidt propose that this primordial awe later generalized to any stimulus that is both vast and that requires accommodation. These stimuli still include being in the presence of a more powerful other (prototypical primordial awe), but also spiritual experiences, grand vistas, natural forces/disasters, human-made works, music, or the experience of understanding a grand scientific theory. Keltner and Haidt propose that awe can have both positive and negative connotations, and that there are five additional features of awe that can color one's experience of the emotion: threat, beauty, ability, virtue, and the supernatural.

==== Awe is a sexually-selected characteristic ====
Keltner and Haidt's model has been critiqued by some researchers, including psychologist Vladimir J. Konečni. Konečni argued that people can experience awe, especially aesthetic awe (of which, according to him, a "sublime stimulus-in-context" is the principal cause) only when they are not in actual physical danger. Konečni postulated that the evolutionary origins of awe are from unexpected encounters with natural wonders, which would have been sexually selected for because reverence, intellectual sensitivity, emotional sensitivity, and elite membership would have been attractive characteristics in a mate, and these characteristics would also have given individuals greater access to awe-inspiring situations. Since high-status people are more likely to be safe from danger and to have access to awe-inspiring situations, Konečni argued that high-status people should feel awe more often than low-status people. However, this hypothesis has yet to be tested and verified.

==== Awe increases systematic processing ====
A third evolutionary theory is that awe serves to draw attention away from the self and toward the environment. This occurs as a way to build informational resources when one is in the presence of novel and complex stimuli that cannot be assimilated by one's current knowledge structures. In other words, awe functions to increase systematic, accommodative processing, and this would have been adaptive for survival. This hypothesis is the most recent and has received the most empirical support, as described in the section on social consequences of awe.

=== Non-evolutionary theories ===
==== Sundararajan's awe ====
Humanistic/forensic psychologist Louise Sundararajan also critiqued Keltner and Haidt's model by arguing that being in the presence of a more powerful other elicits admiration, but does not require mental accommodation because admiration merely reinforces existing social hierarchies. Sundararajan expanded upon Keltner and Haidt's model by arguing that first, an individual must be confronted with perceived vastness. If an individual can assimilate this perceived vastness into their existing mental categories, he/she will not experience awe. If an individual cannot assimilate the perceived vastness, then he/she will need to accommodate to the new information (change his or her mental categories). If this is not accomplished, an individual will experience trauma, such as developing PTSD. If an individual can accommodate, he/she will experience awe and wonder. By this model, the same vast experience could lead to increased rigidity (when assimilation succeeds), increased flexibility (when assimilation fails but accommodation succeeds), or psychopathology (when both assimilation and accommodation fail). Sundararajan did not speculate on the evolutionary origins of awe.

== Research ==
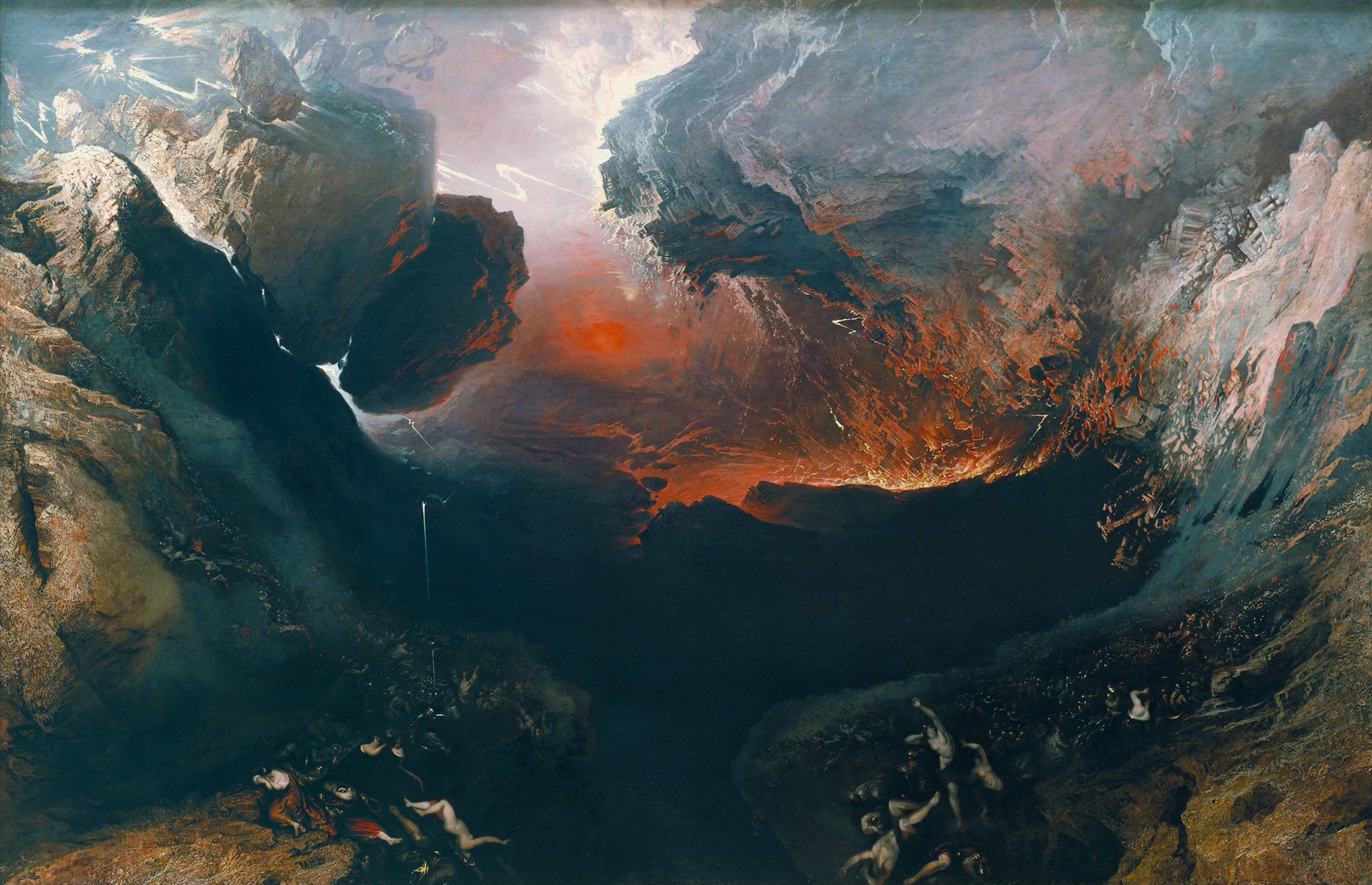
The Great Day of His Wrath by John Martin

As Richard Lazarus wrote in his book on emotions, "Given their [awe and wonder's] importance and emotional power, it is remarkable that so little scientific attention has been paid to aesthetic experience as a source of emotion in our lives". A recent paper published a in-depth review on the research on awe.

=== Precipitants ===
Shiota, Keltner, and Mossman (2007) had participants write about a time they felt awe. They found that nature and art/music were frequently cited as the eliciting stimulus. Although most definitions allow for awe to be positive or negative, participants described only positive precipitants to awe, and it is therefore possible that positive awe and awe+fear (i.e., horror) are distinctly different emotions.

=== Awe and mental health ===
Awe involves five processes linked to well-being: "shifts in neurophysiology, a diminished focus on the self, increased prosocial relationality, greater social integration, and a heightened sense of meaning." Awe fosters optimism, connection, and well-being while reducing anxiety, depression, and social rejection. It reshapes one's self-perception, promotes prosocial actions, strengthens the sense of connection to humanity, and deepens individual feelings of meaning.

=== Emotional experience ===
Shiota, Keltner, and Mossman (2007), had participants write about a time they recently experienced natural beauty (awe condition) or accomplishment (pride condition). When describing the experience of natural beauty, participants were more likely to report that they felt unaware of day-to-day concerns, felt the presence of something greater, didn't want the experience to end, felt connected with the world, and felt small or insignificant.

The study of awe in the West is relatively recent, and the field especially lacks information on awe in non-Western contexts. Nomura, Tsuda, and Rappleye found that the effects of vastness and accommodation leading to a diminished sense of self were consistent among Chinese and American participants; however, Chinese participants had more interpersonal awe experiences than American participants' self-awe experiences. Nature was also found to be very relevant to Japanese participants' awe experiences. However, the effect was not as positive as it was for American participants.

=== Physical displays ===
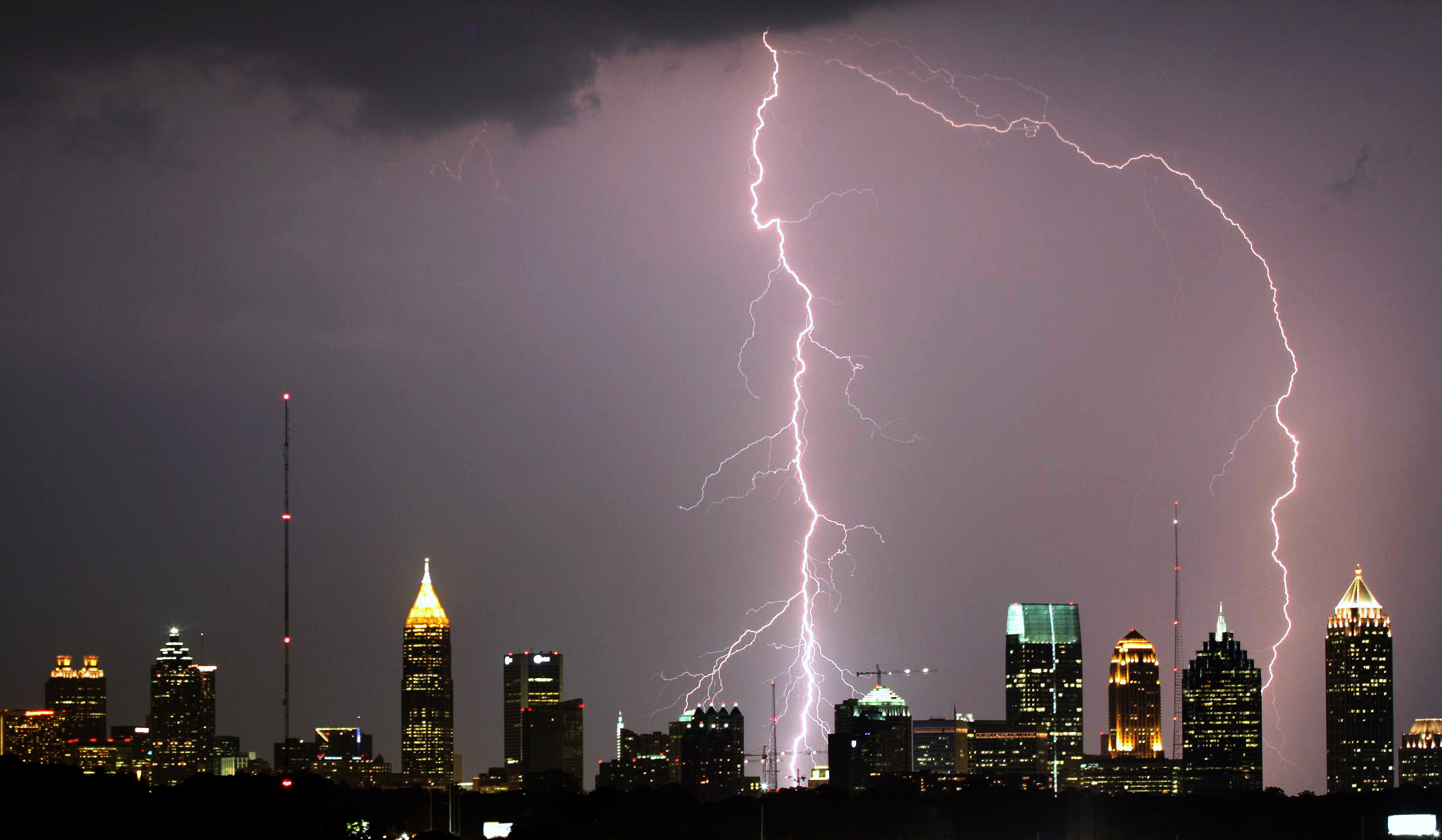
This Atlanta lightning strike may have inspired awe.

Researchers have also attempted to observe the physical, non-verbal reactions to awe by asking participants to remember a time they felt awe and to express the emotion nonverbally. Using this method, researchers observed that awe is often displayed through raised inner eyebrows (78%), widened eyes (61%), and open, slightly drop-jawed mouths (80%). A substantial percent of people also display awe by slightly jutting forward their heads (27%) and visibly inhaling (27%), but smiling is uncommon (10%). Cross-cultural research is needed to determine whether physical displays of awe differ by culture.

=== Personality and awe ===
Some individuals may be more prone to experiencing awe. Using self- and peer-reports, researchers found that regularly experiencing awe was associated with openness to experience (self and peer-ratings) and extroversion (self-ratings). Later studies also found that people who regularly experience awe ("awe-prone") have a lower need for cognitive closure and are more likely to describe themselves in oceanic (e.g. "I am an inhabitant of the planet Earth"), individuated, and universal terms, as opposed to more specific terms (e.g. "I have blonde hair").

=== Social consequences of awe ===
A more recent study found that experiencing awe increased perceptions of time and led to a greater willingness to donate time, but not to donate money. The greater willingness to donate time appeared to be driven by decreased impatience after experiencing awe. Experiencing awe also led participants to report greater momentary life satisfaction and stronger preferences for experiential versus material goods (e.g. prefer a massage to a watch). Awe, unlike most other positive emotions, has been shown to increase systematic processing, rather than heuristic processing, leading participants who experience awe to become less susceptible to weak arguments.

=== Historical and cross-cultural studies of awe ===
Awe has been studied in the context of historical and cross-cultural emotions research, in which the parameters and expression of specific emotions are likely to differ from our own understanding. In Ancient Greece, awe or reverence is expressed by the terms aidôs and sebas. In ancient Mesopotamia, awe is associated with the terms melam (Sumerian) and melammu (Akkadian), a type of "awe-inspiring aura" or radiance possessed by gods, heroes kings, temples, and other things, and possessing, in some contexts, a prosocial capacity. An archaeological study of awe within the framework of the monumental. Poverty Point, USA, examines its role as a prosocial emotion contributing to the forging of larger social and cultural identities.

== Awe and aweism ==
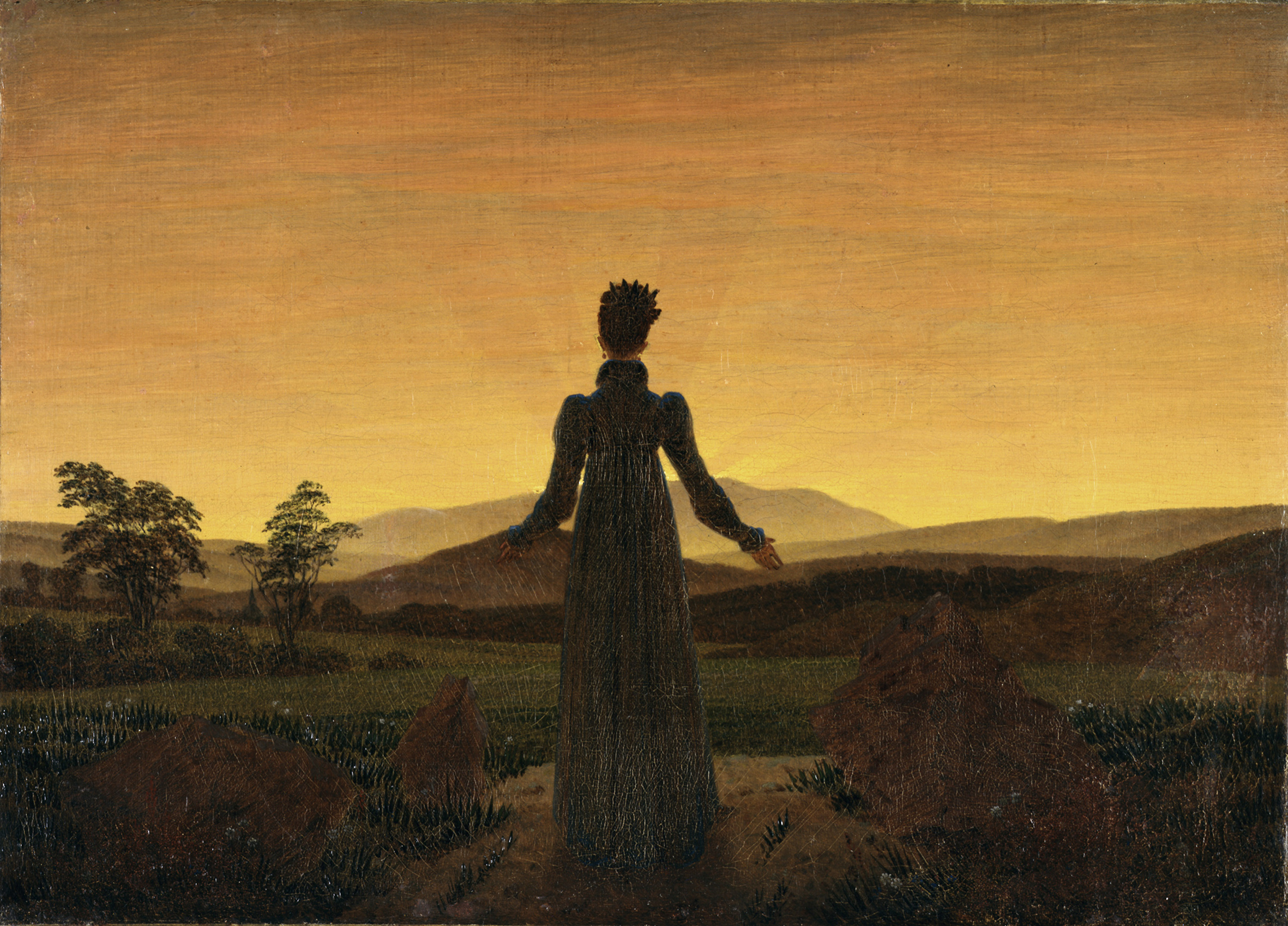
Painting by German Romantic landscape painter Caspar David Friedrich conveying a sense of awe and wonder at a natural sunset

Awe can also be secular. Some critics suggest that atheists do not experience awe, or that experiencing awe makes one spiritual or religious, rather than an atheist, e.g., Oprah's comment that she would not consider swimmer Diana Nyad an atheist because Nyad experiences awe, as well as the response to this video by interfaith activist Chris Stedman. For more examples, see the writings on being an "aweist" by sociologist and atheist Phil Zuckerman, the book Religion for Atheists by author Alain de Botton, and the video on how secular institutions should inspire awe by performance philosopher Jason Silva.

== See also ==
- Oceanic feeling – Feeling of being one with the world
