= Joy =

Feeling of happiness

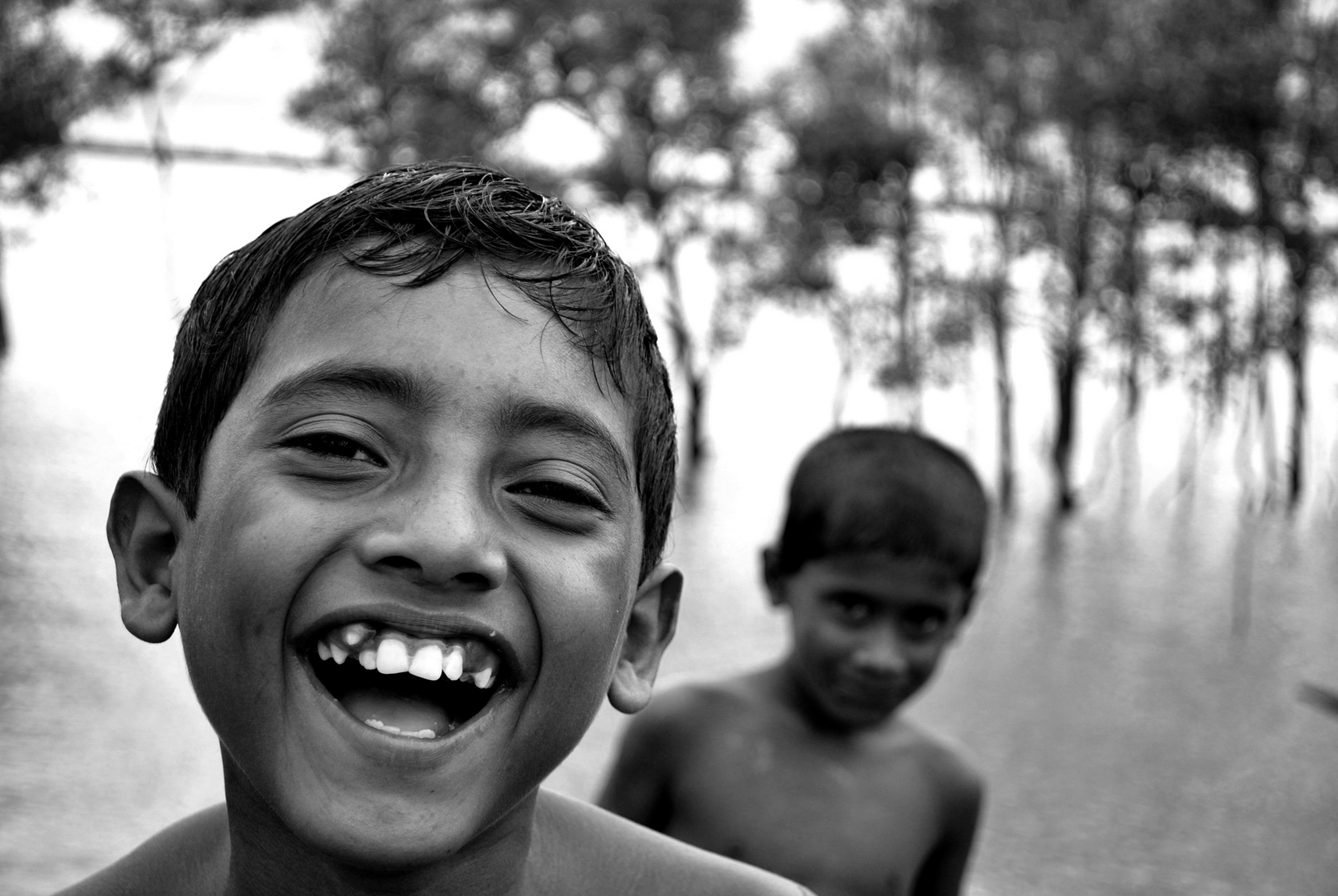
Laughter is a typical expression of joy

Joy is the state of being that allows one to experience feelings of intense, long-lasting happiness and contentment of life. It is closely related to, and often evoked by, well-being, success, or good fortune. Happiness, pleasure, and gratitude are closely related to joy but are not identical to it.

== Terminology ==
C. S. Lewis saw a clear distinction between joy, pleasure, and happiness:"I sometimes wonder whether all pleasures are not substitutes for Joy", and

"I call it Joy, which is here a technical term and must be sharply distinguished both from Happiness and Pleasure. Joy (in my sense) has one characteristic indeed, and one only, in common with them; the fact that anyone who has experienced it will want it again... I doubt whether anyone who has tasted it would ever, if both were in his power, exchange it for all the pleasures in the world. But then Joy is never in our power and Pleasure often is."

Michela Summa distinguishes between joy and happiness: joy

"accompanies the process through and through, whereas happiness seems to be more strictly tied to the moment of achievement of the process... joy is not only a direct emotional response to an event that is embedded in our life-concerns but is also tightly bound to the present moment, whereas happiness presupposes an evaluative stance concerning one period of one's life or one's own life as a whole."

Experiencing joy is enjoyment. A person dedicated to enjoyment is apolaustic.

== Psychology ==
=== Sources and types ===
The causes of joy have been ascribed to various sources.

Ingrid Fetell Lee has studied the sources of joy. She wrote the book Joyful: The Surprising Power of Ordinary Things to Create Extraordinary Happiness, and gave a TED talk on the subject, titled "Where joy hides and how to find it." In it, she discusses the importance of finding joy and understanding what it means. Fetell poses the question of “What is joy?”, and answers it by presenting the idea that the emotion of joy is found in many places, it's true importance is in how it is “elusive” and “mysterious”. She states that joy comes from within, and it can be found everywhere. She goes on to sum up this feeling as “Joy is connected to our fundamental instinct of survival”. According to her, “Each moment of joy is small. But over time they add up to the sum of their parts.”

Joy is most commonly found through engagement, self-connection, and living in the moment.

== Affect theory ==
Joy is one of the less-studied emotions in the wider field of affect theory. Theorist Susanna Paasonen discusses this in her work "Ambiguous Affect", and presents the theory that excitement and joy are what shape a personality, building in past joys. She posits that joy and excitement build connections to things that grow into a larger web of interests, and studies this in relation to social media and how the fleeting and occasionally random nature of this excitement is difficult for companies to quantify in ways that are algorithmic, especially for social media.

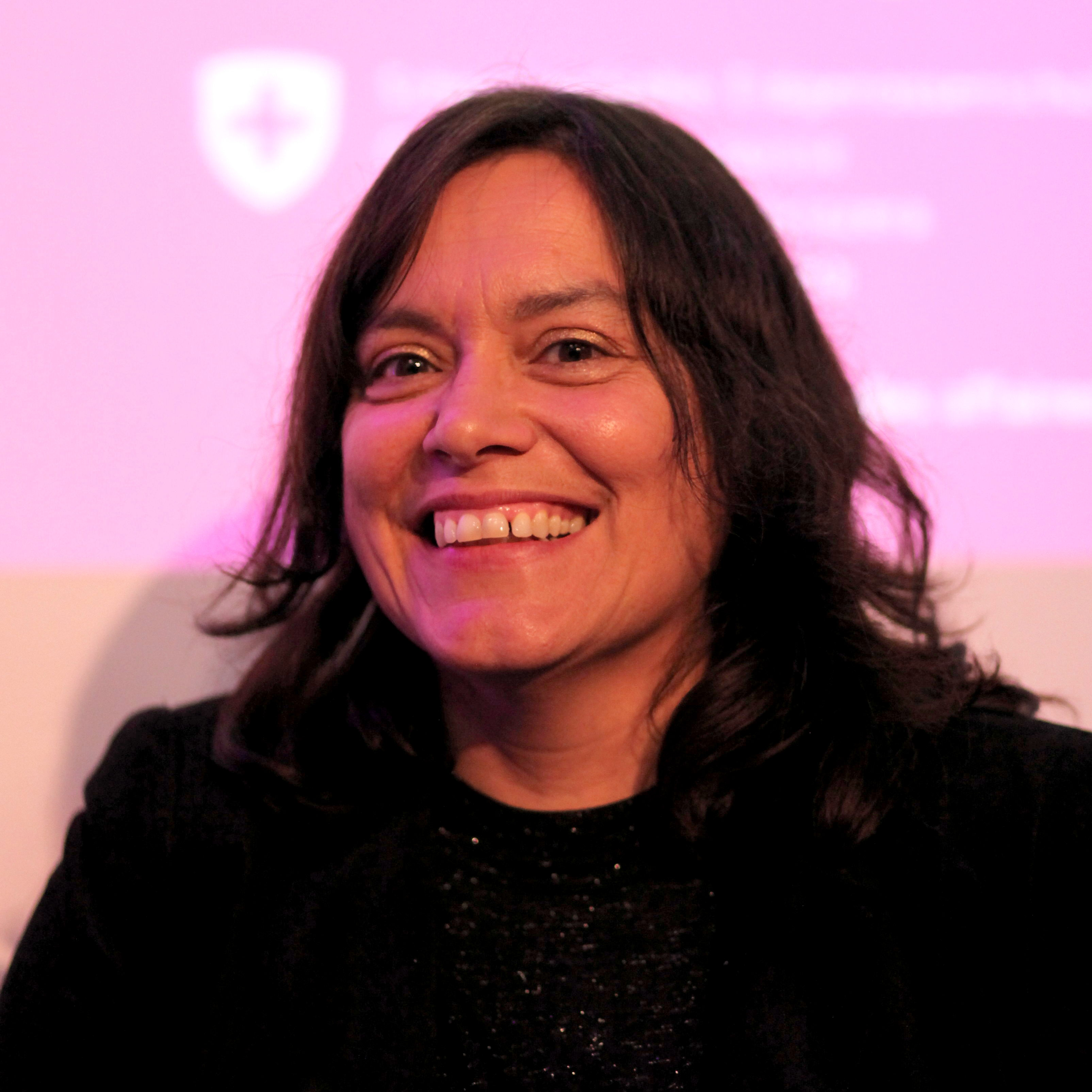
Scholar Sara Ahmed introduced the concept of joy as a "sticky" emotion

Another theorist that discusses joy is Sara Ahmed, a British Australian scholar who focuses on affect theory, feminist theory, queer theory, critical race theory, and postcolonialism. In her article, "Happy Objects", she explores how objects can spark joy and happiness. Ahmed coined the term stickiness, stating emotions like happiness and joy being emotions that are doing. Ahmed states, "Happiness thus puts us into intimate contact with things. We can be happily affected in the present of an encounter; you are affected positively by something, even if that something does not present itself as an object of consciousness."

== Health ==
Joy improves health and well-being and brings psychological changes that improve a person's mood and well-being. Some people have a natural capacity for joy, meaning they experience joy more easily compared to others. While there is no conclusive evidence for the genetics of happiness, joy is known to be hereditary. Experience of joy is increased through healthy habits such as sharing food, physical activity, writing, and self-connection.

== See also ==
- Joie de vivre
- Reward system
