= Social emotions =

Emotions that depend upon other people

Social emotions are emotions that depend upon the thoughts, feelings or actions of other people, "as experienced, recalled, anticipated, or imagined at first hand". Examples are embarrassment, guilt, shame, jealousy, envy, coolness, elevation, empathy, and pride. In contrast, basic emotions such as happiness and sadness only require the awareness of one's own physical state. Therefore, the development of social emotions is tightly linked with the development of social cognition, the ability to imagine other people's mental states, which generally develops in adolescence. Studies have found that children as young as 2 to 3 years of age can express emotions resembling guilt and remorse. However, while five-year-old children are able to imagine situations in which basic emotions would be felt, the ability to describe situations in which social emotions might be experienced does not appear until seven years of age.

People may not only share emotions with others, but may also experience similar physiological arousal to others if they feel a sense of social connectedness to the other person. A laboratory-based study by Cwir, Car, Walton, and Spencer (2011) showed that, when a participant felt a sense of social connectedness to a stranger (research confederate), the participant experienced similar emotional states and physiological responses to that of the stranger while observing the stranger perform a stressful task.

Social emotions are sometimes called moral emotions, because they play an important role in morality and moral decision making. In neuroeconomics, the role social emotions play in game theory and economic decision-making is just starting to be investigated.

== Behavioral neuroscience ==
After functional imaging—functional magnetic resonance imaging (fMRI) in particular—became popular roughly a decade ago, researchers have begun to study economic decision-making with this new technology. This allows researchers to investigate, on a neurological level, the role emotions play in decision-making.

=== Developmental picture ===
The ability to describe situations in which a social emotion will be experienced emerges at around age 7, and, by adolescence, the experience of social emotion permeates everyday social exchange. Studies using fMRI have found that different brain regions are involved in different age groups when performing social-cognitive and social-emotional tasks. While brain areas such as medial prefrontal cortex (MPFC), superior temporal sulcus (STS), temporal poles (TP) and precuneus bordering with posterior cingulate cortex are activated in both adults and adolescents when they reason about intentionality of others, the medial PFC is more activated in adolescents and the right STS more in adults. Similar age effects were found with younger participants, such that, when participants perform tasks that involve theory of mind, increase in age is correlated with an increase in activation in the dorsal part of the MPFC and a decrease in the activity in the ventral part of the MPFC were observed.

Studies that compare adults with adolescents in their processings of basic and social emotions also suggest developmental shifts in brain areas being involved. Comparing with adolescents, the left temporal pole has a stronger activity in adults when they read stories that elicit social emotions. The temporal poles are thought to store abstract social knowledge. This suggests that adult might use social semantic knowledge more often when thinking about social-emotional situations than adolescents.

=== Neuroeconomics ===
To investigate the function of social emotions in economic behaviors, researchers are interested in the differences in brain regions involved when participants are playing with, or think that they are playing with, another person as opposed to a computer. A study with fMRI found that, for participants who tend to cooperate on two-person "trust and reciprocity" games, believing that they are playing with another participant activated the prefrontal cortex, while believing that they are playing with a computer did not. This difference was not seen with players who tend not to cooperate. The authors interpret this difference as theory of minds that cooperators employ to anticipate the opponents' strategies. This is an example of the way social decision making differs from other forms of decision making.

In behavioral economics, a heavy criticism is that people do not always act in a fully rational way, as many economic models assume. For example, in the ultimatum game, two players are asked to divide a certain amount of money, say x. One player, called the proposer, decides ratio by which the money gets divided. The other player, called the responder, decides whether or not to accept this offer. If the responder accepts the offer, say, y amount of money, then the proposer gets x-y amount and the responder gets y. But if the responder refuses to accept the offer, both players get nothing. This game is widely studied in behavioral economics. According to the rational agent model, the most rational way for the proposer to act is to make y as small as possible, and the most rational way for the responder to act is to accept the offer, since little amount of money is better than no money. However, what these experiments tend to find is that the proposers tend to offer 40% of x, and offers below 20% would get rejected by the responders. Using fMRI scans, researchers found that social emotions elicited by the offers may play a role in explaining the result. When offers are unfair as opposed to fair, three regions of the brain are active: the dorsolateral prefrontal cortex (DLPFC), the anterior cingulate cortex (ACC), and the insula. The insula is an area active in registering body discomfort. It is activated when people feel, among other things, social exclusion. The authors interpret activity in the insula as the aversive reaction one feels when faced with unfairness, activity in the DLPFC as processing the future reward from keeping the money, and the ACC is an arbiter that weighs these two conflicting inputs to make a decision. Whether or not the offer gets rejected can be predicted (with a correlation of 0.45) by the level of the responder's insula activity.

Neuroeconomics and social emotions are also tightly linked in the study of punishment. Research using PET scan has found that, when players punish other players, activity in the nucleus accumbens (part of the striatum), a region known for processing rewards derived from actions gets activated. It shows that we not only feel hurtful when we become victims of unfairness, but we also find it psychologically rewarding to punish the wrongdoer, even at a cost to our own utility.

== Social or moral aspect ==
Some social emotions are also referred to as moral emotions because of the fundamental role they play in morality. For example, guilt is the discomfort and regret one feels over one's wrongdoing. It is a social emotion, because it requires the perception that another person is being hurt by this act; and it also has implication in morality, such that the guilty actor, in virtue of feeling distressed and guilty, accepts responsibility for the wrongdoing, which might cause desire to make amends or punish the self.

Not all social emotions are moral emotions. Pride, for instance, is a social emotion which involves the perceived admiration of other people, but research on the role it plays in moral behaviors yields problematic results.

=== Empathic response ===
Empathy is defined by Eisenberg and colleagues as an affective response that stems from the apprehension or comprehension of another's emotional state or condition and is similar to what the other person is feeling or would be expected to feel. Guilt, which is a social emotion with strong moral implication, is also strongly correlated with empathic responsiveness; whereas shame, an emotion with less moral flavor, is negatively correlated with empathic responsiveness, when controlling for guilt.

Perceived controllability also plays an important role modulating people's socio-emotional reactions and empathic responses. For example, participants who are asked to evaluate other people's academic performances are more likely to assign punishments when the low performance is interpreted as low-effort, as opposed to low-ability. Stigmas also elicit more empathic response when they are perceived as uncontrollable (i.e., having a biological origin, such as having certain disease), as opposed to controllable (i.e. having a behavioral origin, such as obesity).

== See also ==
- Emotional contagion
- Group emotion
- Self-conscious emotions
- Social cognitive theory of morality
- Social intelligence
- Social neuroscience
