= Health-related embarrassment =

Health issues

In some instances, medical guidance and help may be accompanied by embarrassment. This form of embarrassment is associated with increased depression and anxiety, and patients report that it is a critical reason for them to avoid care or to lie about the nature and extent of their lifestyle choices, evading potential lectures about their behaviour. Oftentimes, health-related embarrassment is fuelled by the stigma of the issue.

== Contributing factors ==
=== Situational influences ===
Embarrassment can emerge from the environment, such as if there is a doctor of the opposite sex and if there is an examination performed, which may elicit embarrassment if conducted by a parent on someone underage. This effect may be enhanced if the removal of clothes is required for scans, as patients may possess a negative body image. Additionally, unfamiliarity with treatment has been shown to encourage embarrassment. Medical treatment in more close-knit, rural communities elevates embarrassment as well, as patients grow concerned that they will recognise peers in the waiting room.

=== Demographic factors ===
Embarrassment can be exhaustive regardless of the social or peer group dynamics. For instance, those in a disadvantaged socioeconomic situation may be embarrassed by needing financial assistance to obtain medical help, or may not apply for means-tested programs out of potential embarrassment. Those who are homeless have increased levels of embarrassment towards oral health due to 'visibly unhealthy mouths'. LGBTQ people disproportionately feel embarrassment as well, due to healthcare professionals displaying discriminatory behaviour (e.g. deadnaming and 'treating' their identity).

Similarly, embarrassment about requiring medical help is common in older people. In the case of accidental falls, embarrassment may stem from feeling deprived of self-control, and the threat to one's identity with a perceived loss of dignity. Studies have shown that for certain conditions with distinct physical manifestations, e.g. atopic dermatitis, girls endure more embarrassment. Research has speculated that this may be due to girls worrying more about social and romantic relations. For sigmoidoscopies, women were five times more likely than men to rate that they thought it would be 'very embarrassing'. Research has also found that across racial groups, Asian Americans report the highest binge eating embarrassment and bodily embarrassment, which carries implications for more intrusive examinations.

== Vicarious embarrassment ==
Health-related embarrassment can also be experienced as vicarious embarrassment. In commercial contexts, people may feel embarrassed for others when witnessing purchases of 'embarrassing' medical products (e.g. condoms, feminine hygiene products). In the domestic sphere, family members may feel embarrassed that a loved one is suffering from stigmatised conditions, such as substance use disorder or a mental health disorder, and this has been found to be at a greater degree than a general medical condition. Family can also perpetuate embarrassment within the household. Parents can construct barriers to communication with their children as they are uncomfortable discussing topics such as sexual health. This effect is amplified by how the mother is the most common primary source of health information for adolescents.

Personnel who are tasked with the duty of medical guidance and care can uphold this vicarious embarrassment. Sexual education teachers can exhibit awkwardness with the curriculum that triggers disengagement and inadequate teaching. Health-care professionals are also subject to the affective impact of stigma, even with training that directs them not to 'feel' for their patients. A survey of adolescents reported that only 23.1% to 34.2% have had providers openly address substance use and sexually transmitted disease with them, even when most believe that providers should. One study found that embarrassment may result in staff not properly disclosing post-transplant complications that are sexual to patients.

== Interventions and mitigation strategies ==
Numerous interventions have been proposed and developed to reduce health-related embarrassment, such as suggestions for more self-checkouts to reduce store embarrassment. Training programs that have been created include guidelines for professionals on how to navigate non-stigmatised health communication, advising that providers should outwardly acknowledge if there is discomfort or if they lack sufficient knowledge. Providers should aim to disseminate information directly and avoid worsening embarrassment through misplaced humour. Additionally, multimedia education, such as smartphone learning, has been shown to decrease levels of embarrassment. The provision of videos and images delivers more mental preparation than written instructions that are more removed from realism. Fostering comfort can also be achieved by playing music and dimming lights in the treatment room, supplying a source of distraction and a private atmosphere.

As anonymity has been found to reduce embarrassment, services can leverage this by offering outlets for anonymous questions to be asked freely. The internet also serves as a platform to enable this readily. Blogging allows people to share personal health experiences without the fear of social rejection and access community support, and private browsing modes on search engines regularly ensure users confidentiality. Likewise, for sexual symptoms, a preference for chatbot over doctor consultation has been reported, suggesting a less stressful alternative available.

Schemes have also targeted vicarious embarrassment in providers as well, employing cognitive behavioural therapy techniques to challenge stigmatised beliefs held. Workshops on improving health-worker attitudes towards anal sexuality have involved comprehensive education on physiology, sexual pleasure, and disease prevention. Exposure-based methods required workers to confront their biased emotional and cognitive responses. This was followed by cognitive restructuring, which included exercises that applied the framing effect, with workers being guided to focus on safe pleasure rather than disease to promote acceptance and understanding. In another study, providers were also provided with informational content, in this case, that longer durations of breastfeeding lead to better health outcomes. Afterwards, providers displayed more positive attitudes to weaning at later ages.

== See also ==
- Global health
- Health care
- Health promotion
- Self-esteem
- Social stigma
