= Social stigma =

Type of discrimination or disapproval

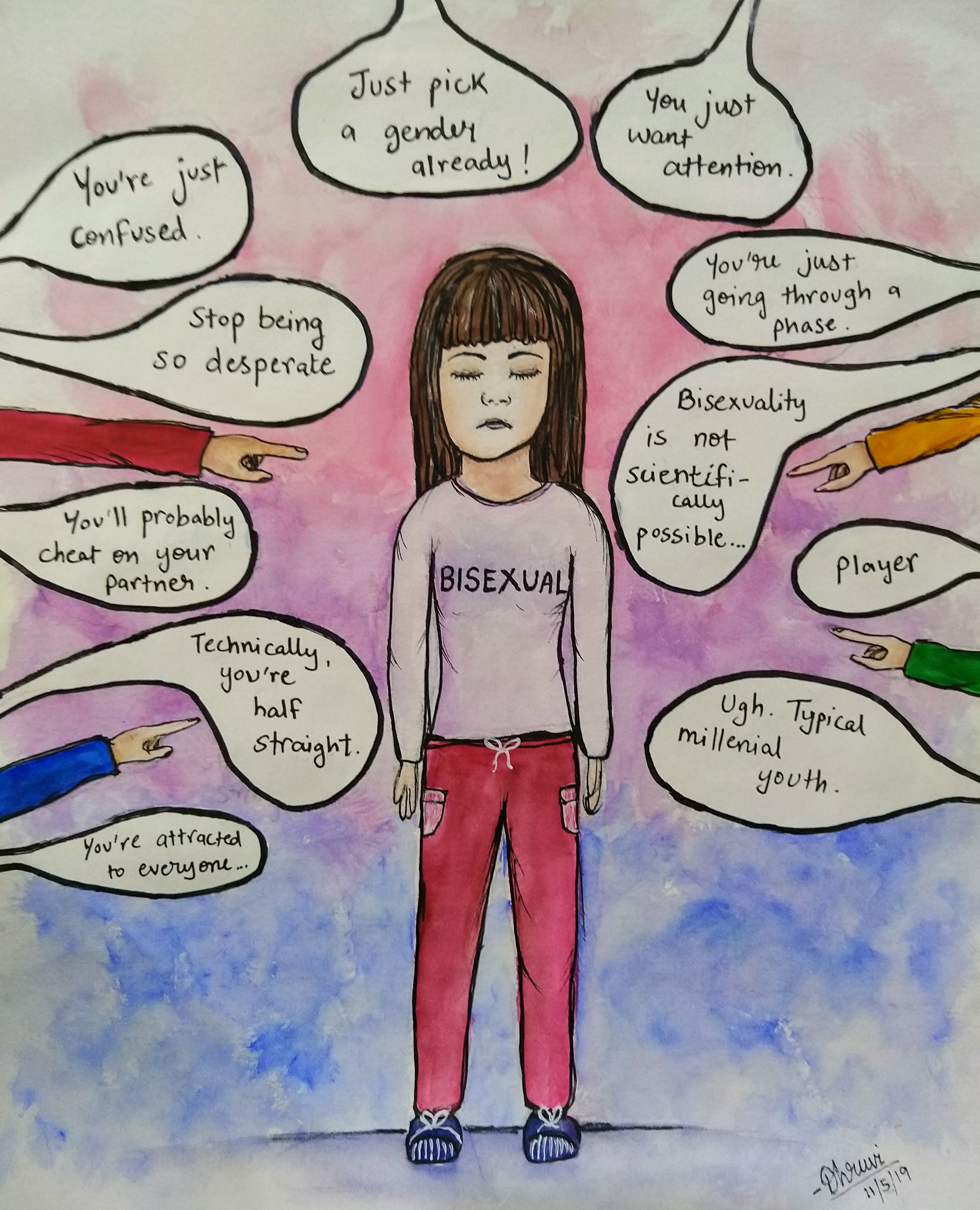
An illustration of examples of various social stigmas against bisexual people

Stigma, originally referring to the visible marking of people considered inferior, has evolved to mean a negative perception or sense of disapproval that a society places on a group or individual based on certain group characteristics such as their socioeconomic status, gender, race, religion, appearance, upbringing, origin, or health status. Social stigma can take different forms and depends on the specific time and place in which it arises, and the existence or assigning of such stigma is stigmatization. Once a person is stigmatized, they are often associated with stereotypes that lead to discrimination, marginalization, and psychological problems.

This process of stigmatization not only affects the social status and behavior of stigmatized persons, but also shapes their own self-perception, which can lead to psychological problems such as depression and low self-esteem. Stigmatized people are often aware that they are perceived and treated differently, which can start at an early age. Research shows that children are aware of cultural stereotypes at an early age, which affects their perception of their own identity and their interactions with the world around them.

== Description ==
Stigma (plural stigmas or stigmata) is a Greek word that in its origins referred to a type of marking or the tattoo that was cut or burned into the skin of people with criminal records, slaves, or those seen as traitors in order to visibly identify them as supposedly blemished or morally polluted persons. These individuals were to be avoided particularly in public places.

Stigma may also be described as a label that associates a person to a set of unwanted characteristics that form a stereotype. It is also affixed.

Stigma may affect the behavior of those who are stigmatized. Those who are stereotyped often start to act in ways that their stigmatizers expect of them. It not only changes their behavior, but it also shapes their emotions and beliefs. Members of stigmatized social groups often face prejudice that causes depression (i.e. deprejudice).

Members of stigmatized groups start to become aware that they are not being treated the same way and know they are likely being discriminated against. Studies have shown that "by 10 years of age, most children are aware of cultural stereotypes of different groups in society, and children who are members of stigmatized groups are aware of cultural types at an even younger age."

== Main theories and contributions ==
=== Émile Durkheim ===
"In 1895, French sociologist Émile Durkheim laid the groundwork for studying stigma by introducing the concept of deviance as a normal social phenomenon. In The Rules of Sociological Method, he wrote:"

Imagine a society of saints, a perfect cloister of exemplary individuals. Crimes or deviance, properly so-called, will there be unknown; but faults, which appear venial to the layman, will there create the same scandal that the ordinary offense does in ordinary consciousnesses. If then, this society has the power to judge and punish, it will define these acts as criminal (or deviant) and will treat them as such.

=== Erving Goffman ===
Erving Goffman described stigma as a phenomenon whereby an individual with an attribute which is deeply discredited by their society is rejected as a result of the attribute. Goffman saw stigma as a process by which the reaction of others spoils normal identity.

More specifically, he explained that what constituted this attribute would change over time. "It should be seen that a language of relationships, not attributes, is really needed. An attribute that stigmatizes one type of possessor can confirm the usualness of another, and therefore is neither credible nor discreditable as a thing in itself."

In Goffman's theory of social stigma, a stigma is an attribute, behavior, or reputation which is socially discrediting in a particular way: it causes an individual to be mentally classified by others in an undesirable, rejected stereotype rather than in an accepted, normal one. Goffman defined stigma as a special kind of gap between virtual social identity and actual social identity:

While a stranger is present before us, evidence can arise of his possessing an attribute that makes him different from others in the category of persons available for him to be, and of a less desirable kind—in the extreme, a person who is quite thoroughly bad, or dangerous, or weak. He is thus reduced in our minds from a whole and usual person to a tainted discounted one. Such an attribute is a stigma, especially when its discrediting effect is very extensive [...] It constitutes a special discrepancy between virtual and actual social identity. (Goffman 1963:3).

==== The stigmatized, the normal, and the wise ====
Goffman divides the individual's relation to a stigma into three categories:

1. the stigmatized being those who bear the stigma;
2. the normals being those who do not bear the stigma; and
3. the wise being those among the normals who are accepted by the stigmatized as understanding and accepting of their condition (borrowing the term from the homosexual community).

The wise normals are not merely those who are in some sense accepting of the stigma; they are, rather, "those whose special situation has made them intimately privy to the secret life of the stigmatized individual and sympathetic with it, and who find themselves accorded a measure of acceptance, a measure of courtesy membership in the clan." That is, they are accepted by the stigmatized as "honorary members" of the stigmatized group. "Wise persons are the marginal men before whom the individual with a fault need feel no shame nor exert self-control, knowing that in spite of his failing he will be seen as an ordinary other," Goffman notes that the wise may in certain social situations also bear the stigma with respect to other normals: that is, they may also be stigmatized for being wise. An example is a parent of a homosexual; another is a white woman who is seen socializing with a black man (assuming social milieus in which homosexuals and dark-skinned people are stigmatized).

A 2012 study showed empirical support for the existence of the own, the wise, and normals as separate groups; but the wise appeared in two forms: active wise and passive wise. The active wise encouraged challenging stigmatization and educating stigmatizers, but the passive wise did not.

==== Ethical considerations ====
Individuals actively cope with stigma in ways that vary across stigmatized groups, across individuals within stigmatized groups, and within individuals across time and situations.

==== The stigmatized ====
The stigmatized are ostracized, devalued, scorned, shunned and ignored. They experience discrimination in the realms of employment and housing. Perceived prejudice and discrimination is also associated with negative physical and mental health outcomes. Young people who experience stigma associated with mental health difficulties may face negative reactions from their peer group. Those who perceive themselves to be members of a stigmatized group, whether it is obvious to those around them or not, often experience psychological distress and many view themselves contemptuously.

Although the experience of being stigmatized may take a toll on self-esteem, academic achievement, and other outcomes, many people with stigmatized attributes have high self-esteem, perform at high levels, are happy and appear to be quite resilient to their negative experiences.

==== The stigmatizer ====
From the perspective of the stigmatizer, stigmatization involves threat, aversion and sometimes the depersonalization of others into stereotypic caricatures. Stigmatizing others can serve several functions for an individual, including self-esteem enhancement, control enhancement, and anxiety buffering, through downward-comparison—comparing oneself to less fortunate others can increase one's own subjective sense of well-being and therefore boost one's self-esteem.

21st-century social psychologists consider stigmatizing and stereotyping to be a normal consequence of people's cognitive abilities and limitations, and of the social information and experiences to which they are exposed.

Current views of stigma, from the perspectives of both the stigmatizer and the stigmatized person, consider the process of stigma to be highly situationally specific, dynamic, complex and nonpathological.

=== Gerhard Falk ===
German-born sociologist and historian Gerhard Falk wrote: "All societies will always stigmatize some conditions and some behaviors because doing so provides for group solidarity by delineating 'outsiders' from 'insiders'."

Falk describes stigma based on two categories, existential stigma and achieved stigma. He defines existential stigma as "stigma deriving from a condition which the target of the stigma either did not cause or over which he has little control." He defines Achieved Stigma as "stigma that is earned because of conduct and/or because they contributed heavily to attaining the stigma in question."

Stigmatization, at its essence, is a challenge to one's humanity- for both the stigmatized person and the stigmatizer. The majority of stigma researchers have found the process of stigmatization has a long history and is cross-culturally ubiquitous.

=== Link and Phelan stigmatization model ===
Bruce Link and Jo Phelan propose that stigma exists when four specific components converge:

1. Individuals differentiate and label human variations.
2. Prevailing cultural beliefs tie those labeled to adverse attributes.
3. Labeled individuals are placed in distinguished groups that serve to establish a sense of disconnection between "us" and "them".
4. Labeled individuals experience "status loss and discrimination" that leads to unequal circumstances.

In this model stigmatization is also contingent on "access to social, economic, and political power that allows the identification of differences, construction of stereotypes, the separation of labeled persons into distinct groups, and the full execution of disapproval, rejection, exclusion, and discrimination." Subsequently, in this model, the term stigma is applied when labeling, stereotyping, disconnection, status loss, and discrimination all exist within a power situation that facilitates stigma to occur.

==== Disadvantage ====
The fourth component of stigmatization in this model includes "status loss and discrimination". Many definitions of stigma do not include this aspect, however, these authors believe that this loss occurs inherently as individuals are "labeled, set apart, and linked to undesirable characteristics." The members of the labeled groups are subsequently disadvantaged in the most common group of life chances including income, education, mental well-being, housing status, health, and medical treatment. Thus, stigmatization by the majorities, the powerful, or the "superior" leads to the Othering of the minorities, the powerless, and the "inferior". Whereby the stigmatized individuals become disadvantaged due to the ideology created by "the self," which is the opposing force to "the Other." As a result, the others become socially excluded and those in power reason the exclusion based on the original characteristics that led to the stigma.

==== Necessity of power ====
The authors also emphasize the role of power (social, economic, and political power) in stigmatization. While the use of power is clear in some situations, in others it can become masked as the power differences are less stark. An extreme example of a situation in which the power role was explicitly clear was the treatment of Jewish people by the Nazis. On the other hand, an example of a situation in which individuals of a stigmatized group have "stigma-related processes" occurring would be the inmates of a prison. It is imaginable that each of the steps described above would occur regarding the inmates' thoughts about the guards. However, this situation cannot involve true stigmatization, according to this model, because the prisoners do not have the economic, political, or social power to act on these thoughts with any serious discriminatory consequences.

=== "Stigma allure" and authenticity ===
Sociologist Matthew W. Hughey explains that prior research on stigma has emphasized individual and group attempts to reduce stigma by "passing as normal", by shunning the stigmatized, or through selective disclosure of stigmatized attributes. Yet, some actors may embrace particular markings of stigma (e.g.: social markings like dishonor or select physical dysfunctions and abnormalities) as signs of moral commitment and/or cultural and political authenticity. Hence, Hughey argues that some actors do not simply desire to "pass into normal" but may actively pursue a stigmatized identity formation process in order to experience themselves as causal agents in their social environment. Hughey calls this phenomenon "stigma allure".

=== The "six dimensions of stigma" ===
While often incorrectly attributed to Goffman, the "six dimensions of stigma" were not his invention. They were developed to augment Goffman's two levels—the discredited and the discreditable. Goffman considered individuals whose stigmatizing attributes are not immediately evident. In that case, the individual can encounter two distinct social atmospheres. In the first, he is discreditable—his stigma has yet to be revealed but may be revealed either intentionally by him (in which case he will have some control over how) or by some factor, he cannot control. Of course, it also might be successfully concealed; Goffman called this passing. In this situation, the analysis of stigma is concerned only with the behaviors adopted by the stigmatized individual to manage his identity: the concealing and revealing of information. In the second atmosphere, he is discredited—his stigma has been revealed and thus it affects not only his behavior but the behavior of others. Jones et al. (1984) added the "six dimensions" and correlate them to Goffman's two types of stigma, discredited and discreditable.

There are six dimensions that match these two types of stigma:

1. Concealable – the extent to which others can see the stigma
2. Course of the mark – whether the stigma's prominence increases, decreases, or disappears
3. Disruptiveness – the degree to which the stigma and/or others' reaction to it impedes social interactions
4. Aesthetics – the subset of others' reactions to the stigma comprising reactions that are positive/approving or negative/disapproving but represent estimations of qualities other than the stigmatized person's inherent worth or dignity
5. Origin – whether others think the stigma is present at birth, accidental, or deliberate
6. Peril – the danger that others perceive (whether accurately or inaccurately) the stigma to pose to them

=== Types ===
In Unraveling the contexts of stigma, authors Campbell and Deacon describe Goffman's universal and historical forms of Stigma as the following.

- Overt or external deformities – such as leprosy, clubfoot, cleft lip or palate and muscular dystrophy.
- Known deviations in personal traits – being perceived rightly or wrongly, as weak willed, domineering or having unnatural passions, e.g., mental disorders, imprisonment, addiction, homosexuality, unemployment and suicidal attempts.
- Tribal stigma – affiliation with a specific nationality, religion, or race that constitute a deviation from the normative, e.g. being African American, or being of Arab descent in the United States after the 9/11 attacks.

==== Deviance ====
Stigma occurs when an individual is identified as deviant, linked with negative stereotypes that engender prejudiced attitudes, which are acted upon in discriminatory behavior. Goffman illuminated how stigmatized people manage their "Spoiled identity" (meaning the stigma disqualifies the stigmatized individual from full social acceptance) before audiences of normals. He focused on stigma, not as a fixed or inherent attribute of a person, but rather as the experience and meaning of difference.

Gerhard Falk expounds upon Goffman's work by redefining deviant as "others who deviate from the expectations of a group" and by categorizing deviance into two types:

- Societal deviance refers to a condition widely perceived, in advance and in general, as being deviant and hence stigma and stigmatized. "Homosexuality is, therefore, an example of societal deviance because there is such a high degree of consensus to the effect that homosexuality is different, and a violation of norms or social expectation".
- Situational deviance refers to a deviant act that is labeled as deviant in a specific situation, and may not be labeled deviant by society. Similarly, a socially deviant action might not be considered deviant in specific situations. "A robber or other street criminal is an excellent example. It is the crime which leads to the stigma and stigmatization of the person so affected."
- The physically disabled, mentally ill, homosexuals, and a host of others who are labeled deviant because they deviate from the expectations of a group, are subject to stigmatization—the social rejection of numerous individuals, and often entire groups of people who have been labeled deviant.

=== Stigma communication ===
Communication is involved in creating, maintaining, and diffusing stigmas, and enacting stigmatization. The model of stigma communication explains how and why particular content choices (marks, labels, peril, and responsibility) can create stigmas and encourage their diffusion. A recent experiment using health alerts tested the model of stigma communication, finding that content choices indeed predicted stigma beliefs, intentions to further diffuse these messages, and agreement with regulating infected persons' behaviors.

More recently, scholars have highlighted the role of social media channels, such as Facebook and Instagram, in stigma communication. These platforms serve as safe spaces for stigmatized individuals to express themselves more freely. However, social media can also reinforce and amplify stigmatization, as the stigmatized attributes are amplified and virtually available to anyone indefinitely.

=== Challenging ===
Stigma, though powerful and enduring, is not inevitable, and can be challenged. There are two important aspects to challenging stigma: challenging the stigmatization on the part of stigmatizers and challenging the internalized stigma of the stigmatized. To challenge stigmatization, Campbell et al. 2005 summarise three main approaches.

1. There are efforts to educate individuals about non-stigmatising facts and why they should not stigmatize.
2. There are efforts to legislate against discrimination.
3. There are efforts to mobilize the participation of community members in anti-stigma efforts, to maximize the likelihood that the anti-stigma messages have relevance and effectiveness, according to local contexts.

In relation to challenging the internalized stigma of the stigmatized, Paulo Freire's theory of critical consciousness is particularly suitable. Cornish provides an example of how sex workers in Sonagachi, a red light district in India, have effectively challenged internalized stigma by establishing that they are respectable women, who admirably take care of their families, and who deserve rights like any other worker. This study argues that it is not only the force of the rational argument that makes the challenge to the stigma successful, but concrete evidence that sex workers can achieve valued aims, and are respected by others.

Stigmatized groups often harbor cultural tools to respond to stigma and to create a positive self-perception among their members. For example, advertising professionals have been shown to suffer from negative portrayal and low approval rates. However, the advertising industry collectively maintains narratives describing how advertisement is a positive and socially valuable endeavor, and advertising professionals draw on these narratives to respond to stigma.

Another effort to mobilize communities exists in the gaming community through organizations like:

- Take This – who provides AFK rooms at gaming conventions plus has a Streaming Ambassador Program to reach more than 135,000 viewers each week with positive messages about mental health, and
- NoStigmas – whose mission "is to ensure that no one faces mental health challenges alone" and envisions "a world without shame or discrimination related to mental health, brain disease, behavioral disorders, trauma, suicide and addiction" plus offers workplaces a NoStigmas Ally course and individual certifications.

=== Organizational stigma ===
In 2008, an article by Hudson coined the term "organizational stigma" which was then further developed by another theory building article by Devers and colleagues. This literature brought the concept of stigma to the organizational level, considering how organizations might be considered as deeply flawed and cast away by audiences in the same way individuals would. Hudson differentiated core-stigma (a stigma related to the very nature of the organization) and event-stigma (an isolated occurrence which fades away with time). A large literature has debated how organizational stigma relate to other constructs in the literature on social evaluations. A 2020 book by Roulet reviews this literature and disentangle the different concepts—in particular differentiating stigma, dirty work, scandals—and exploring their positive implications.

=== Stigma in healthcare settings ===
Recent research suggests that addressing perceived and enacted stigma in clinical settings is critical to ensuring delivery of high-quality patient-centered care. Specifically, perceived stigma by patients was associated with longer periods of poor physical or mental health. Additionally, perceived stigma in healthcare settings was associated with higher odds of reporting a depressive disorder. Among other findings, individuals who were married, younger, had higher income, had college degrees, and were employed reported significantly fewer poor physical and mental health days and had lower odds of self-reported depressive disorder. A complementary study conducted in New York City (as opposed to nationwide), found similar outcomes. The researchers' objectives were to assess rates of perceived stigma in clinical settings reported by racially diverse New York City residents and to examine if this perceived stigma was associated with poorer physical and mental health outcomes. They found that perceived stigma was associated with poorer healthcare access, depression, diabetes, and poor overall general health.

=== Mental disorders ===
Empirical research on the stigma associated with mental disorders, pointed to a surprising attitude of the general public. Those who were told that mental disorders had a genetic basis were more prone to increase their social distance from the mentally ill, and also to assume that the ill were dangerous individuals, in contrast with those members of the general public who were told that the illnesses could be explained by social and environmental factors. Furthermore, those informed of the genetic basis were also more likely to stigmatize the entire family of the ill. Although the specific social categories that become stigmatized can vary over time and place, the three basic forms of stigma (physical deformity, poor personal traits, and tribal outgroup status) are found in most cultures and eras, leading some researchers to hypothesize that the tendency to stigmatize may have evolutionary roots.

The impact of the stigma is significant, leading many individuals to not seek out treatment. For example, evidence from a refugee camp in Jordan suggests that providing mental health care comes with a dilemma: between the clinical desire to make mental health issues visible and actionable through datafication and the need to keep mental health issues hidden and out of the view of the community to avoid stigma. That is, in spite of their suffering the refugees were hesitant to receive mental health care as they worried about stigma.

Currently, several researchers believe that mental disorders are caused by a chemical imbalance in the brain. Therefore, this biological rationale suggests that individuals struggling with a mental illness do not have control over the origin of the disorder. Much like cancer or another type of physical disorder, persons suffering from mental disorders should be supported and encouraged to seek help. The Disability Rights Movement recognises that while there is considerable stigma towards people with physical disabilities, the negative social stigma surrounding mental illness is significantly worse, with those suffering being perceived to have control of their disabilities and being responsible for causing them. "Furthermore, research respondents are less likely to pity persons with mental illness, instead of reacting to the psychiatric disability with anger and believing that help is not deserved." Although there are effective mental health interventions available across the globe, many persons with mental illnesses do not seek out the help that they need. Only 59.6% of individuals with a mental illness, including conditions such as depression, anxiety, schizophrenia, and bipolar disorder, reported receiving treatment in 2011.

Reducing the negative stigma surrounding mental disorders may increase the probability of affected individuals seeking professional help from a psychiatrist or a non-psychiatric physician. How particular mental disorders are represented in the media can vary, as well as the stigma associated with each. On the social media platform, YouTube, depression is commonly presented as a condition that is caused by biological or environmental factors, is more chronic than short-lived, and different from sadness, all of which may contribute to how people think about depression.

==== Causes ====
Arikan found that a stigmatising attitude to psychiatric patients is associated with narcissistic personality traits.

In Taiwan, strengthening the psychiatric rehabilitation system has been one of the primary goals of the Department of Health since 1985. This endeavor has not been successful. It was hypothesized that one of the barriers was social stigma towards the mentally ill. Accordingly, a study was conducted to explore the attitudes of the general population towards patients with mental disorders. A survey method was utilized on 1,203 subjects nationally. The results revealed that the general population held high levels of benevolence, tolerance on rehabilitation in the community, and nonsocial restrictiveness. Essentially, benevolent attitudes were favoring the acceptance of rehabilitation in the community. It could then be inferred that the belief (held by the residents of Taiwan) in treating the mentally ill with high regard, and the progress of psychiatric rehabilitation may be hindered by factors other than social stigma.

==== Artists ====
In the music industry, specifically in the genre of hip-hop or rap, those who speak out on mental illness are heavily criticized. However, according to an article by The Huffington Post, there's a significant increase in rappers who are breaking their silence on depression and anxiety.

==== Addiction and substance use disorders ====
Throughout history, addiction has largely been seen as a moral failing or character flaw, as opposed to an issue of public health. Substance use has been found to be more stigmatized than smoking, obesity, and mental illness. Research has shown stigma to be a barrier to treatment-seeking behaviors among individuals with addiction, creating a "treatment gap". A systematic review of all epidemiological studies on treatment rates of people with alcohol use disorders found that over 80% had not accessed any treatment for their disorder.

Research shows that the words used to talk about addiction can contribute to stigmatization, and that the commonly used terms of "abuse" and "abuser" actually increase stigma. Behavioral addictions (i.e. gambling, sex, etc.) are found to be more likely to be attributed to character flaws than substance-use addictions. Stigma is reduced when Substance Use Disorders are portrayed as treatable conditions. Acceptance and Commitment Therapy has been used effectively to help people to reduce shame associated with cultural stigma around substance use treatment.

The use of the different substances such as cocaine, methamphetamine, or alcohol has been strongly stigmatized. For example, studies have identified stigmatizing attitudes toward people who use these and other substances, whereby stigma increased due to various factors, such as whether the user is male, addicted to drugs believed to be "stronger," or if potential stigmatizers lack familiarity with addiction or hold conservative values. Furthermore, attitudes that stigmatize seem to change over time. An Australian national population study have shown that the proportion of Australians who nominated methamphetamine as a "drug problem" increased between 2001–2019. The epidemiological study provided evidence that levels of under-reporting have increased over the period, which coincided with the deployment of public health campaigns on the dangers of ice that had stigmatizing elements that portrayal of persons who used the drugs in a negative way. The level of under-reporting of methamphetamine use is strongly associated with increasing negative attitudes towards their use over the same period.

=== Poverty ===
Recipients of public assistance programs are often scorned as unwilling to work. The intensity of poverty stigma is positively correlated with increasing inequality. As inequality increases, societal propensity to stigmatize increases. This is in part, a result of societal norms of reciprocity which is the expectation that people earn what they receive rather than receiving assistance in the form of what people tend to view as a gift.

Poverty is often perceived as a result of failures and poor choices rather than the result of socioeconomic structures that suppress individual abilities. Disdain for the impoverished can be traced back to its roots in Anglo-American culture where poor people have been blamed and ostracized for their misfortune for hundreds of years. The concept of deviance is at the bed rock of stigma towards the poor. Deviants are people that break important norms of society that everyone shares. In the case of poverty it is breaking the norm of reciprocity that paves the path for stigmatization.

=== Public assistance ===
Social stigma is prevalent towards recipients of public assistance programs. This includes programs frequently utilized by families struggling with poverty such as Head Start and AFDC (Aid To Families With Dependent Children). The value of self-reliance is often at the center of feelings of shame and the fewer people value self reliance the less stigma affects them psychologically. Stigma towards welfare recipients has been proven to increase passivity and dependency in poor people and has further solidified their status and feelings of inferiority.

Caseworkers frequently treat recipients of welfare disrespectfully and make assumptions about deviant behavior and reluctance to work. Many single mothers cited stigma as the primary reason they wanted to exit welfare as quickly as possible. They often feel the need to conceal food stamps to escape judgement associated with welfare programs. Stigma is a major factor contributing to the duration and breadth of poverty in developed societies which largely affects single mothers. Recipients of public assistance are viewed as objects of the community rather than members allowing for them to be perceived as enemies of the community which is how stigma enters collective thought. Amongst single mothers in poverty, lack of health care benefits is one of their greatest challenges in terms of exiting poverty. Traditional values of self reliance increase feelings of shame amongst welfare recipients making them more susceptible to being stigmatized.

=== Epilepsy ===
==== Hong Kong ====
Epilepsy, a common neurological disorder characterized by recurring seizures, is associated with various social stigmas. Chung-yan Guardian Fong and Anchor Hung conducted a study in Hong Kong which documented public attitudes towards individuals with epilepsy. Of the 1,128 subjects interviewed, only 72.5% of them considered epilepsy to be acceptable; 11.2% would not let their children play with others with epilepsy; 32.2% would not allow their children to marry persons with epilepsy; additionally, some employers (22.5% of them) would terminate an employment contract after an epileptic seizure occurred in an employee with unreported epilepsy. Suggestions were made that more effort be made to improve public awareness of, attitude toward, and understanding of epilepsy through school education and epilepsy-related organizations.

=== Media ===
In the early 21st century, technology has a large impact on the lives of people in multiple countries and has shaped social norms. Many people own a television, computer, and a smartphone. The media can be helpful with keeping people up to date on news and world issues and it is very influential on people. Because it is so influential sometimes the portrayal of minority groups affects attitudes of other groups toward them. Much media coverage has to do with other parts of the world. A lot of this coverage has to do with war and conflict, which people may relate to any person belonging from that country. There is a tendency to focus more on the positive behavior of one's own group and the negative behaviors of other groups. This promotes negative Smartphone thoughts of people belonging to those other groups, reinforcing stereotypical beliefs.

"Viewers seem to react to violence with emotions such as anger and contempt. They are concerned about the integrity of the social order and show disapproval of others. Emotions such as sadness and fear are shown much more rarely." (Unz, Schwab & Winterhoff-Spurk, 2008, p. 141)

In a study testing the effects of stereotypical advertisements on students, 75 high school students viewed magazine advertisements with stereotypical female images such as a woman working on a holiday dinner, while 50 others viewed nonstereotypical images such as a woman working in a law office. These groups then responded to statements about women in a "neutral" photograph. In this photo, a woman was shown in a casual outfit not doing any obvious task. The students that saw the stereotypical images tended to answer the questionnaires with more stereotypical responses in 6 of the 12 questionnaire statements. This suggests that even brief exposure to stereotypical ads reinforces stereotypes. (Lafky, Duffy, Steinmaus & Berkowitz, 1996)

=== Education and culture ===
Laurence J. Coleman first adapted Erving Goffman's (1963) social stigma theory to gifted children, providing a rationale for why children may hide their abilities and present alternate identities to their peers. The stigma of giftedness theory was further elaborated by Laurence J. Coleman and Tracy L. Cross in their book entitled, Being Gifted in School, which is a widely cited reference in the field of gifted education. In the chapter on Coping with Giftedness, the authors expanded on the theory first presented in a 1988 article. According to Google Scholar, this article has been cited over 300 times in the academic literature (as of 2022).

Coleman and Cross were the first to identify intellectual giftedness as a stigmatizing condition and they created a model based on Goffman's (1963) work, research with gifted students, and a book that was written and edited by 20 teenage, gifted individuals.

=== Abortion ===
While abortion is very common throughout the world, people may choose not to disclose their use of such services, in part due to the stigma associated with having had an abortion. Keeping abortion experiences secret has been found to be associated with increased isolation and psychological distress. Abortion providers are also subject to stigma.

=== Stigmatization of prejudice ===
Cultural norms can prevent displays of prejudice as such views are stigmatized and thus people will express non-prejudiced views even if they believe otherwise (preference falsification). However, if the stigma against such views is lessened, people will be more willing to express prejudicial sentiments. For example, following the 2008 economic crisis, anti-immigration sentiment seemingly increased amongst the US population when in reality the level of sentiment remained the same and instead it simply became more acceptable to openly express opposition to immigration.

=== Spatial Stigma ===
Spatial stigma refers to stigmas that are linked to ones geographic location. This can be applied to neighborhoods, towns, cities or any defined geographical space. A person's geographic location or place of origin can be a source of stigma.

== See also ==
- Badge of shame
- Closure
- Collateral consequences of criminal charges
- Cringe culture
- Dehumanization
- Guilt by association
- Health-related embarrassment
- Identity
- Infertility and childlessness stigmas
- Interpersonal theory of suicide
- Label
- Labeling
- Leprosy stigma
- Passing
- Post-assault treatment of sexual assault victims
- Scapegoat
- Self-concealment
- Self-schema
- Social alienation
- Social defeat
- Social exclusion
- Social stigma of obesity
- Stereotype threat
- Stig-9 perceived mental illness stigma questionnaire
- Stigma management
- Time to Change
- Winner and loser culture
