= Theory of fundamental causes =

Sociological theory of health disparities

In 1995, Jo C. Phelan and Bruce G. Link developed the theory of fundamental causes. This theory seeks to outline why the association between socioeconomic status (SES) and health disparities has persisted over time, particularly when diseases and conditions previously thought to cause morbidity and mortality among low SES individuals have resolved. The theory states that an ongoing association exists between SES and health status because SES "embodies an array of resources, such as money, knowledge, prestige, power, and beneficial social connections that protect health no matter what mechanisms are relevant at any given time." In other words, despite advances in screening techniques, vaccinations, or any other piece of health technology or knowledge, the underlying fact is that those from low SES communities lack resources to protect and/or improve their health. Link and Phelan have developed and presented the theory based on the relationship between SES and health outcomes, but have noted that many combinations between an independent variable and sets of dependent variables are possible as long as the required components are fulfilled.

== Key components ==
According to Link and Phelan, a fundamental social cause of health inequalities has four key components:

1. The cause influences multiple disease outcomes
2. The cause affects disease outcomes through multiple risk factors.
3. The cause involves access to resources that can assist in avoiding health risks or to minimize the sequelae of disease once it occurs.
4. "The association between a fundamental cause and health is reproduced over time via the replacement of intervening mechanisms"

By these criteria, SES is a fundamental cause for healthcare disparities.

== Previous school of thought on health disparities ==
Health has been linked to social class dating back to the early 19th century, when the French tracked mortality in connection with areas of poverty. Similarly, the English began documenting mortality by occupation in the mid-1800s. In the United States, more attention was paid to racial connections to health disparities up until 1973, when Evelyn M. Kitagawa and Philip Hauser published a report connecting SES to increased morbidity and mortality.

In the 19th century, the major causes of mortality were typically infectious diseases, as well as diseases that resulted from poor sanitation and crowded living conditions. In 1900, the top three causes of death were pneumonia, tuberculosis, and diarrhea. Because lower SES individuals were more likely to live in crowded, unsanitary conditions, it was thought that the improvement of these conditions would lead to an improvement in health. Enormous progress was made in the 20th century in alleviating these conditions thanks to the development of antibiotics, vaccination, sewage management systems, hygiene, and improved education regarding sanitation and food safety, and life expectancy increased for all SES groups. Yet disparities in healthcare and health outcomes have persisted.

== The role of resources ==
Link and Phelan state that the key resources that lower SES individuals lack include knowledge, money, power, prestige, and beneficial social connections. At a given SES level, this lack of resources persists despite what other factors, beneficial or not so, are at play.

=== Knowledge ===
Knowledge primarily includes health literacy, but may also involve the knowledge that is gained via access to physicians and the medical establishment. Health literacy can be defined as "the knowledge and competencies of persons to meet the complex demands of health in society." While previously health literacy was defined as the ability to read materials in a medical context, the definition has evolved to include more than simply the ability to read. It now encompasses a broad range of skills and activities that decrease the asymmetry of information in the health care marketplace.

=== Money ===
The relationship between money and health is linear with a positive slope; that is, the more money a person has, the better their health, with some exceptions. At a basic level, income enables people to access and pay for health care when it is necessary or to purchase health insurance. Beyond this, money also provides the ability to fund healthy choices, including purchasing nutritious food, a gym membership, and medications. On an even larger scale, it provides the ability to make adaptations to the work or residential environment, e.g., changing jobs, relocating to a safer neighborhood, or retiring from work at the time of one's choosing. Each of these factors demonstrate that finances play a key role in health decisions and overall health.

=== Power and prestige ===
In the context of health care and access, power is the ability to exert one's influence to effect change on the behalf of oneself or others. Prestige is the "reputation or influence arising from success, achievement, rank, or other favorable attributes." Power and prestige are factors in determining a person's place in the social hierarchy, and they manifest themselves in multiple ways. One is power and prestige in the workplace. Those with power in their jobs are able to take days off of work for leisure or to access medical care. According to the Whitehall Studies, a gradient was observed across all levels of employment, with those wielding the greatest amount of power in their jobs having the lowest mortality levels.

Another example of the use of power and prestige is the ability to exert political power. Specifically, "electoral engagement is positively correlated with income at the individual level." This demonstrates that those who are of lower socio-economic status are at a disadvantage in terms of the political clout that they possess. Because lower-income individuals are less likely to vote for representatives and for other ballot measures, the policies and laws put into place may not serve their interests.

=== Beneficial social connections ===
Social connections can be conceptualized in two ways: one, connections between unrelated social worlds, and, two, social relations within relatively closed worlds. Those of lower SES may lack the first type more than the second, which places them at a more significant disadvantage in terms of their health status. Someone from a higher-SES group may have friends or colleagues who are health care providers, attorneys, or politicians. Through these social connections, broader networks can be accessed that may provide health benefits.

Conversely, some lower-SES individuals, specifically Latinos, benefit from strong community relationships. This has been referred to as the Barrio advantage, which states that Mexican-Americans living in areas with high densities of Mexicans experience "sociocultural advantages" that "outweigh the disadvantages conferred by the high poverty of those neighborhoods."

== Intervening mechanisms ==
A final key part of the theory is the persistence of resource disparities that perpetuate unequal health outcomes, despite intervening mechanisms that may otherwise appear to improve health status. An example of this is the Pap smear for cervical cancer screening. Since the development of the Pap smear in the 1940s, a disparity has existed in utilization of this screening test given differences in resources mentioned above. Another example is the polio vaccine. Prior to the vaccine, polio could afflict people of all socioeconomic classes. Once the vaccine became available, it was primarily accessible by those who possessed the resources to obtain it. We also see an example of this in colorectal cancer, in which diffusion of information plays a role. This led to a theoretical expansion discussing when inequalities tend to arise in new situations and highlighting when inequalities might disappear for older diseases that are more effectively controlled. Under this theory, diffusion of information plays two roles - it can help to reduced mortality, and is a mechanism through which knowledge operates, but it is not sufficient to eliminate SES inequalities as seen in Wang et al. 2012.

These examples demonstrate how intervening mechanisms, e.g., the Pap smear and the polio vaccine, did not decrease health disparities given that certain groups possessed resources to access them and others did not.
