= Oaxaca (disambiguation) =

Oaxaca is a state in Mexico.

Oaxaca may also refer to:

- Oaxaca City, a city and municipality in the state of Oaxaca, Mexico
- Oaxaca Valley, in Oaxaca State
- Oaxaca cheese, Mexican cheese
- Oaxaca (ship)
- Alebrijes de Oaxaca, a Mexican football team
- Blinder-Oaxaca decomposition, a method in econometrics
- Oaxaca (album), a live compilation CD by American jazz pianist Vince Guaraldi, or the title song
- "Oaxaca", a song by Maserati from Pyramid of the Sun

== Persons with the surname ==
- Ronald Oaxaca (born c. 1943), American economist
