= Cringe culture =

Culture of mocking embarrassing content

Cringe culture is an Internet phenomenon and neologism characterized by the mockery and ridicule of content, behaviors, or expressions deemed embarrassing or awkward. The term cringe evolved semantically from describing personal secondhand embarrassment to becoming a dismissive label applied to various forms of online expression and fan behavior.

The phenomenon emerged in the early 2000s as a response to awkward online content but gradually transformed into a cultural force that impacted fan communities, creative expression, and social media behavior. Cringe culture gained particular prominence through online platforms like Reddit and 4chan, and has been observed to cause the decline of various fandoms when they become labeled as cringe.

Cringe culture has extended beyond Internet communities into academic and professional settings. Educators have noticed increased self-consciousness among students about displaying effort in their work (known as tryharding). By the early 2020s, a cultural pushback against cringe culture began to emerge, with public figures and celebrities advocating for authentic self-expression and rejecting the fear of being perceived as "trying too hard".

== Origin ==
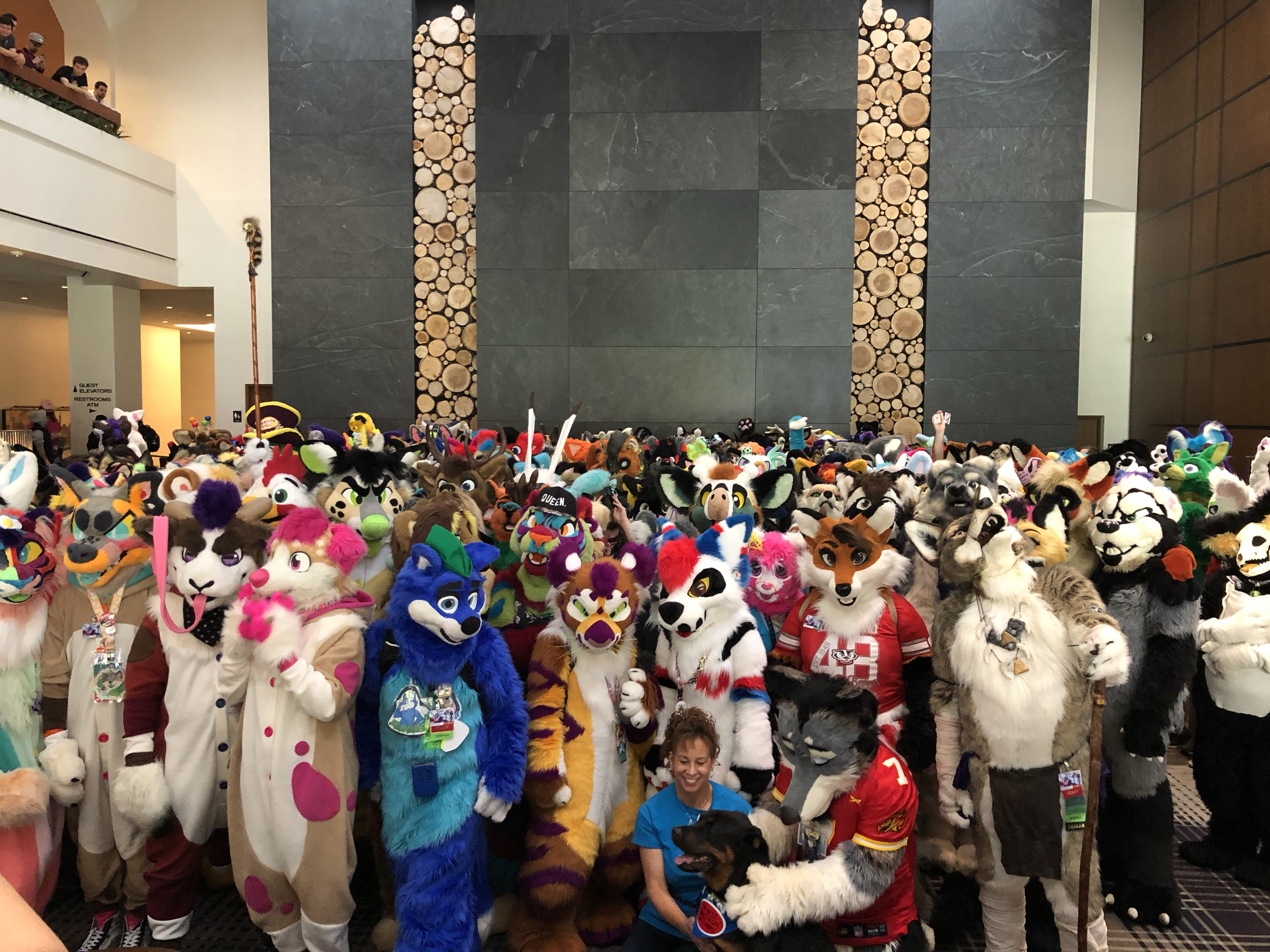
A group of furries, a common recipient of cringe culture discussion

The term cringe underwent semantic change from its original usage describing a physically shrinking back or recoiling, especially in fear or discomfort, to a sense of embarrassment. The term gained popularity in online forums during the early 2000s, when public self-humiliation online was a relatively novel phenomenon. Early cringe culture drew much of its content from YouTube. According to Kaitlyn Tiffany of The Atlantic, the majority of cringe stemmed from people who did not seem to understand that anyone in the world could see their videos. The phenomenon initially focused on empathy and secondhand embarrassment, with viewers relating to the awkward situations they witnessed. Popular early examples of cringe include the 2002 viral video Star Wars Kid and "My Video for Briona for Our 7 Month", in which a man winks, licks his lips, and makes romantic declarations to his partner.

Early cringe culture encompassed multiple styles, including self-deprecating, playful, and hostile forms. On /b/ (4chan's "random" board), early cringe discussions targeted groups like Tumblr users, social justice warriors, fangirls, and furries, while also being used to describe "normies" who lacked sufficient knowledge of Internet culture to understand its ironic humor.

In July 2012, Reddit user Michael Dombkowski took over the dormant r/cringe subreddit after watching a KENS5 segment about teen werewolves. Dombkowski created RSS feeds to alert him whenever someone mentioned cringe anywhere on Reddit, then encouraged users to visit his subreddit. The subreddit collected 10,000 monthly pageviews in its first month, which grew to 941,000 by September 2012 and 5 million the following month. According to The Daily Dot, Dombkowski had intended the subreddit to elicit empathy from viewers rather than to mock its subjects.

On November 9, 2012, Dombkowski banned all images from r/cringe and created r/cringepics as a spinoff subreddit for image-based content. The community initially opposed this decision, as users worried that it would fragment the community. In a few months, r/cringepics overtook r/cringe in traffic and subscribers. By 2014, the combined subreddits amassed over 500,000 subscribers and more than 30 million monthly pageviews. In a March 2013 company AMA ("Ask Me Anything"), Reddit's general manager Erik Martin stated that he hates "r/cringepics and anything cringe related and the whole idea."

== Impact ==
Cringe culture has impacted various fandoms. Screen Rant dubbed the phenomenon in which a fandom abruptly dissipates when suddenly deemed cringe (due to the actions of individuals within the fandom or the fandom being re-evaluated as a whole) as the "My Hero Academia Effect". My Hero Academia initially enjoyed popularity in 2020 during the COVID-19 pandemic, but the resurfacing of embarrassing TikTok videos of convention-goers in 2020 caused the My Hero Academia fandom to be deemed cringy, and thus was abandoned by many anime fans. Similarly, the fandom of the Homestuck webcomic, which ran from 2009 to 2016, faced scrutiny when a rumor spread of a cosplayer filling a hotel bathtub with Sharpies to achieve gray skin coloring (emulating the design of the Homestuck characters). Over the following years, many fans abandoned the fandom, and as a result, according to Screen Rant, the Homestuck fandom was almost non-existent by 2024. It is worth noting that as of September 27, 2025 animation studio SpindleHorse, also responsible for the popular animated show Hazbin Hotel (another common recipient of Cringe Culture discussion) has released a Homestuck animated pilot episode on YouTube. Other fandoms that were deemed cringy include the Stranger Things and Hazbin Hotel fandoms.

Isobel Heal of Varsity described being "far too insecure as a teen to even consider listening to songs inspired by My Little Pony or Five Nights at Freddy's regardless of how catchy they were," but found that attending a Living Tombstone concert allowed her to overcome these inhibitions. She wrote that everyone in the crowd was "completely unafraid to engage in the silliness of the entire night," which allowed her to "let my guard down and enjoy the evening without fear of feeling 'cringe.'" Heal described her experience of singing along to tracks like "Discord", a My Little Pony–themed song, provided what she described as healing "the wounds of the younger me" and represented a form of reclaiming interests that had been suppressed due to social pressure and bullying.

== Reactions ==
New York University professor Ocean Vuong observed that students increasingly hesitate to reveal effort behind their creative work. Vuong stated that students often say "I want to be a good writer, but it's a bit cringe" and perform cynicism because it can be misread as intelligence.

In May 2022, Taylor Swift addressed cringe culture in her commencement speech at New York University: she advised graduates to "learn to live alongside cringe" and that "cringe is unavoidable over a lifetime." Other celebrities have made public speeches fighting against the perceived notion that "tryharding" is cringe. In his 31st Screen Actors Guild Awards acceptance speech, Timothée Chalamet emphasized his pursuit of greatness and the effort he invested in his roles, which diverged from typical humble acceptance speeches. In her 67th Annual Grammy Awards acceptance speech, rapper Doechii also stressed her dedication and hard work. According to The Daily Dot, X users called Chalamet and Doechii's speeches "refreshing" and decried those who embrace cringe culture as "miserable losers".

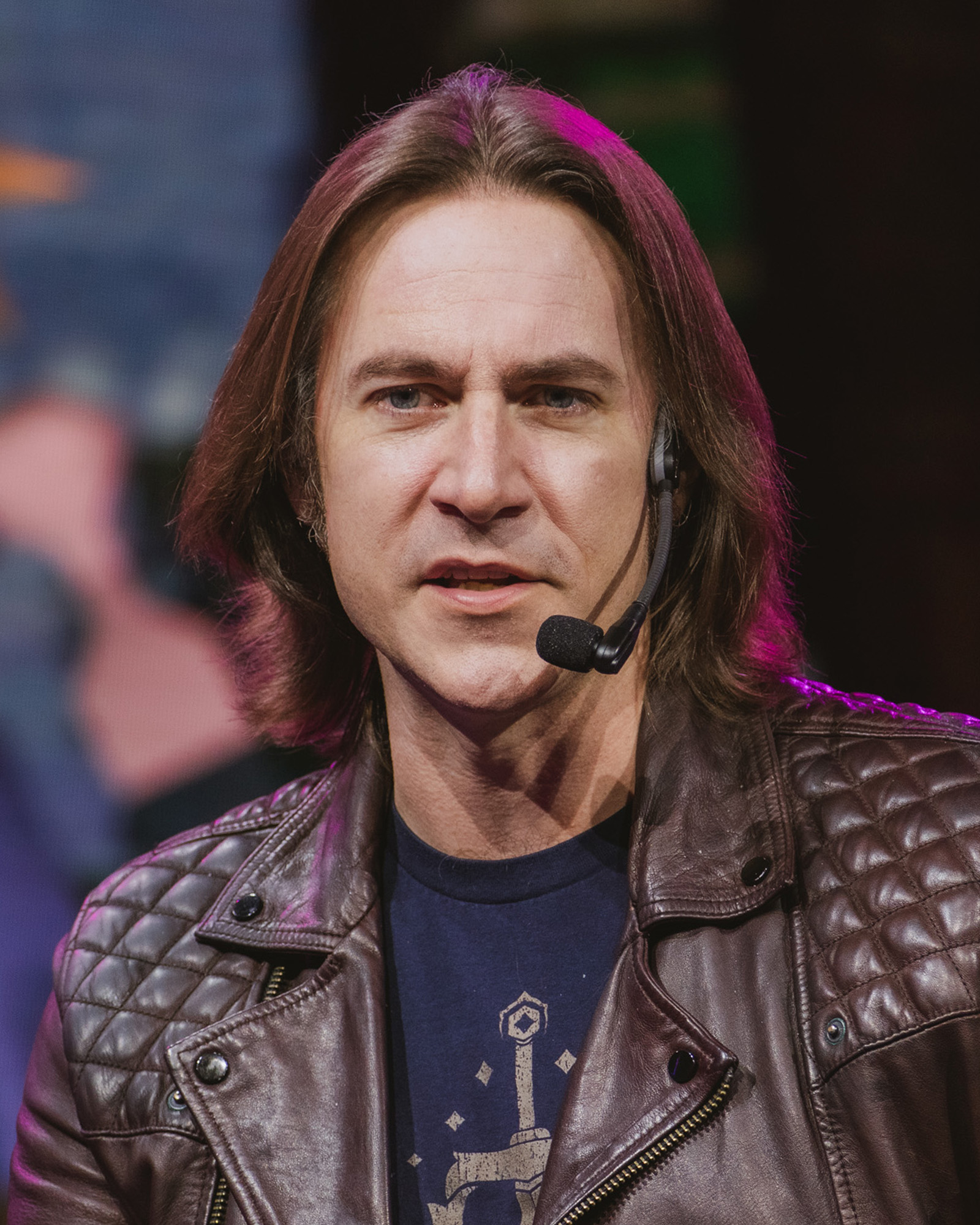
Matthew Mercer, the dungeon master of the popular web series Critical Role, criticized cringe culture as suppressing one's authentic self.

In 2023, Critical Role dungeon master Matthew Mercer spoke against cringe culture at New York Comic Con: "We live in an odd time of 'cringe culture' where anything that's honest can be called cringe. And I don't agree with that." Mercer argued that much of what is dismissed as cringe consists of "people being their authentic self."

In October 2025, actress and singer Ariana Grande discussed her experience with cringe culture in an interview on the podcast Shut Up Evan. She described the phenomenon as "unfair", stating that people should be allowed to express passion and happiness without judgement. She further explained that in the wake of her leading role in the 2024 film Wicked there were those who perceived the behavior of her and costar Cynthia Erivo during the film's press tour as "inauthentic" and therefore cringe.

== Analysis ==
In 2021, Steven Dashiell wrote in the journal Studies in Popular Culture that cringe culture functions as a mechanism for social boundaries within the My Little Pony: Friendship Is Magic fandom, and that cringe culture operates not only between different communities but also within fandoms themselves. In his analysis, Dashiell examined a Reddit thread where a brony (an adult fan of My Little Pony: Friendship Is Magic) expressed embarrassment about other bronies. The thread received over 400 comments in which participants engaged in what Dashiell termed other-izing: distancing themselves from behaviors they deemed cringeworthy. Rather than defending the criticized bronies, commenters consistently used the term cringe to describe their reactions to certain fan behaviors while distinguishing themselves from the so-called "deviant brony" to normalize their own participation in the fandom.

A February 2024 Hinge report revealed that more than half of Generation Z worries about cringe while dating and are 50 percent more likely than millennials to delay responding to avoid seeming overeager.

== See also ==
- Anti-bronies
- Cancel culture
- Cringe comedy
- Cyberbullying
- Internet culture
- Irony poisoning
- Online shaming
