= Amano =

Amano (天野, amano; lit. "heaven field") is a Japanese surname. Notable people with the surname include:

- Akira Amano (天野 明; born 1973), manga artist
- Carlos Amano (born 1976), Japanese wrestler
- Emily Amano (born 2000), Canadian soccer player
- Eugene Amano (born 1982), Filipino-born NFL player
- Hiroshi Amano (天野 浩; born 1960), Japanese physicist, inventor of blue LED light, 2014 Nobel laureate
- Hiroyuki Amano (天野 博之; born 1970), Japanese comedian, actor, voice actor, television presenter, film director and film critic
- Jun Amano (天野 純; born 1991), Japanese footballer
- Kohichi Amano (天野 浩一; born 1979), Japanese baseball player
- Kousei Amano (天野 浩成; born 1978), Japanese actor
- Kōyū Amano (天野 高雄; born 1968), Japanese Buddhist monk
- Kozue Amano (天野 こずえ; born 1974), Japanese manga artist
- Maia Amano (born 2001), American trampoline gymnast
- Masamichi Amano (天野 正道; born 1957), Japanese music composer
- Shiro Amano (天野 シロ; born 1976), Japanese manga artist
- Takashi Amano (天野 尚; 1954–2015), Japanese aquarium designer and photographer
- Takashi Amano (footballer) (天野 貴史; born 1986), Japanese footballer
- Takashige Amano (天野 隆重; 1503–1584), Japanese samurai and commander
- Tameyuki Amano (天野 為之; 1861–1938), Japanese politician, educator and economist
- Tsuki Amano (天野 月), Japanese singer
- Amano Yasukage (天野 康景; 1537–1613), Japanese samurai
- Yōichi Amano (天野 洋一; born 1981), Japanese manga artist
- Yoshitaka Amano (天野 喜孝; born 1952), Japanese illustrator
- Yukichi Amano (天野 祐吉; 1933–2013), Japanese columnist
- Yukiya Amano (天野 之弥; 1947–2019), Director General of the International Atomic Energy Agency
- Yuri Amano (天野 由梨; born 1966), Japanese voice actress

== Fictional characters ==
- Ai Amano (天野 あい), the protagonist of Video Girl Ai
- Ginji Amano (天野 銀次), the protagonist of GetBackers
- Hinase Amano (阿万野 ひなせ), a minor character in Hug! Pretty Cure
- Ichigo Amano (天野 いちご), the protagonist of Yumeiro Patissiere
- Keita Amano (天野 景太), a character in Yo-Kai Watch
- Keita Amano (雨野 景太), the main character in Gamers!
- Jyaku Amano (天邪鬼), the protagonist of Urotsukidōji
- Madoka Amano (天野 まどか), the main character in Beyblade: Metal Fusion
- Megumi Amano (天野 めぐみ), the protagonist of Amano Megumi wa Sukidarake!
- Megumi Amano (天野 恵), a character in Urotsukidoji
- Mishio Amano (天野 美汐), a minor character in Kanon
- Miu Amano (天野 美雨), a character in Blend S
- Nene Amano (天野 ネネ), a character in Digimon Fusion
- Rea Amano (天野 礼亜), a recurring character in Future Diary
- Shoko Amano (天野 翔子), a minor character in Soaring Sky! Pretty Cure
- Yukiteru Amano (天野 雪輝), the main character in Future Diary
- Yuu Amano (天野 ユウ), a character in Digimon Fusion

== See also ==
- Amano, 13th century King of the Hadiya Sultanate
- Amano shrimp, a species of shrimp found in Asia
