= Cringe comedy =

Subgenre of comedy

Cringe comedy is a subgenre of comedy that derives humor from social awkwardness, guilty pleasure, self-deprecation, idiosyncratic humor, and personal distress. Cringe comedy frequently pulls from mundane situations and is often used in pseudo-reality TV shows and mockumentaries.

Typically, the protagonists are egotists who overstep the boundaries of political correctness and break social norms. The comedy will attack the protagonist by not letting them become aware of their self-centered view, or by making them oblivious to the ego-deflation that the comedy deals them. Sometimes an unlikable protagonist may not suffer any consequences, which violates people's moral expectations, and also makes the audience cringe.

== Theory ==
Humor theorist Noël Carroll explains this kind of humor in relation to incongruity theory and annoyance:

Imagine the cutlery laid out for a formal dinner. Suppose that the salad fork is in the wrong place. If you are the sort of person who is disturbed by such deviations from the norm, you will not be capable of finding this amusing. On the other hand, if you are more easy-going about such matters and also aware of the incongruity, it may elicit a chuckle. That is, you may find the error amusing or not. But if you find it genuinely amusing, you cannot find it annoying.

== Examples ==
Notable examples in the genre of cringe comedy include:

=== Film ===
- The 40-Year-Old Virgin
- American Pie
- Bean
- Borat
- Bridesmaids
- Death at a Funeral
- The Lobster
- There's Something About Mary
- Waiting for Guffman

=== Television ===
- Ally McBeal
- Arrested Development
- The Comeback
- Crazy Ex-Girlfriend
- Curb Your Enthusiasm
- Da Ali G Show
- Extras
- Fleabag
- Girls
- I Think You Should Leave with Tim Robinson
- I'm Alan Partridge
- Impractical Jokers
- The Inbetweeners
- The Larry Sanders Show
- The Last Man on Earth
- Louie
- The Mindy Project
- Nathan for You
- The Office
- Parks and Recreation
- Peep Show
- People Just Do Nothing
- Review
- Veep

== See also ==
- Cringe culture
