= Jonah B. Gelbach =

American economist

- Born: Jonah Benjamin Gelbach
- Known for: Gelbach decomposition

Academic background
- Education: University of Massachusetts Amherst (BA); Massachusetts Institute of Technology (PhD); Yale Law School (JD)
- Thesis: Three essays in labor and public economics (1998)
- Doctoral advisor: Jonathan Gruber; Joshua David Angrist

Jonah Benjamin Gelbach is an American economist and academic who is Herman F. Selvin Professor of Law at the UC Berkeley School of Law. He is known for developing the Gelbach decomposition in 2016.

== Biography ==
He received a BA in economics from the University of Massachusetts Amherst in 1993, a PhD in economics from the Massachusetts Institute of Technology in 1998, and a JD from Yale Law School in 2013. His doctoral advisors were Jonathan Gruber and Joshua David Angrist.

He worked at the University of Maryland at College Park, as an assistant professor in economics from 1998 to 2005 and as an associate professor in economics from 2005 to 2007.

== Bibliography ==
=== Journal articles ===
- Cameron, A. Colin; Gelbach, Jonah B.; Miller, Douglas L. (August 2008). "Bootstrap-Based Improvements for Inference with Clustered Errors". Review of Economics and Statistics. 90 (3): 414–427. doi:10.1162/rest.90.3.414.
- Cameron, A. Colin; Gelbach, Jonah B.; Miller, Douglas L. (2011). "Robust Inference With Multiway Clustering". Journal of Business & Economic Statistics. 29 (2): 238–249. ISSN 0735-0015.
- Gelbach, Jonah B. (2016). "When Do Covariates Matter? And Which Ones, and How Much?". Journal of Labor Economics. 34 (2): 509–543. ISSN 0734-306X.
