= Gelbach decomposition =

Statistical method

The Gelbach decomposition is a statistical method used to decompose changes in regression coefficients that occur when additional explanatory variables are added to a model. Developed by economist Jonah B. Gelbach in 2016, the technique provides an exact accounting of how omitted variables contribute to differences between coefficients in nested linear regressions.

The method is commonly used in economics, sociology, and other social sciences to examine the extent to which observed differences between groups are explained by measurable characteristics. For example, researchers studying wage gaps may estimate a baseline model containing only a group indicator and then add controls such as education, occupation, and work experience. The Gelbach decomposition quantifies the precise contribution of each set of controls to the change in the estimated group coefficient.

== See also ==
- Blinder–Oaxaca decomposition
