= Nervous laughter =

Human expression

Nervous laughter is laughter provoked from an audience's expression of alarm, embarrassment, discomfort or confusion, rather than amusement. Nervous laughter is usually less robust in expression than "a good belly laugh", and may be combined with confused glances or awkward silence on the part of others in the audience. Nervous laughter is considered analogous to a courtesy laugh, which may be rendered by more of a conscious effort in an attempt to move a situation along more quickly, especially when the comedian is pausing for laughter.

Nervous laughter is a physical reaction to stress, tension, confusion, or anxiety. Neuroscientist Vilayanur S. Ramachandran states, "We have nervous laughter because we want to make ourselves think what horrible thing we encountered isn't really as horrible as it appears, something we want to believe." Psychologist and neuroscientist Robert Provine, from the University of Maryland, studied over 1,200 "laughter episodes" and determined that 80% of laughter isn't a response to an intentional joke.

Unhealthy or "nervous" laughter comes from the throat. This nervous laughter is not true laughter, but an expression of tension and anxiety. Instead of relaxing a person, nervous laughter tightens them up even further. Much of this nervous laughter is produced in times of high emotional stress, especially during times where an individual is afraid they might harm another person in various ways, such as a person's feelings or even physically.

People laugh when they need to project dignity and control during times of stress and anxiety. In these situations, people usually laugh in an unconscious attempt to reduce stress and calm down, however, it often works otherwise. Nervous laughter is often considered fake laughter and even heightens the awkwardness of the situation.

People may laugh nervously when exposed to stress due to witnessing others' pain. For instance, in Stanley Milgram's obedience experiment, subjects ("teachers") were told to shock "learners" every time the learners answered a question incorrectly. Although the "learners" were not actually shocked, the subjects believed they were. As they were going through the study, many of the "subjects showed signs of extreme tension and conflict". Milgram observed some subjects laughing nervously when they heard the "learners'" false screams of pain. In A Brief Tour of Human Consciousness, neuroscientist V.S. Ramachandran suggests that laughter is used as a defense mechanism used to guard against overwhelming anxiety. Laughter often diminishes the suffering associated with a traumatic event.

If the individual is shy or bashful and appears nervous when talking, they are likely to exhibit nervous laughter. Individuals who are shy and introverted who find themselves the center of conversational attention often become "giddy" with nervous laughter; this is an unconscious response caused by the brain over-thinking due to social anxiety or inexperience.
