= Interdisciplinary Association for Population Health Science =

The Interdisciplinary Association for Population Health Science (abbreviated IAPHS) is an interdisciplinary membership organization dedicated to research in population health. It was incorporated as a 501(c)(3) non-profit organization in 2015, and was officially launched on September 19, 2016. Its inaugural president was Sandro Galea (Boston University), who was elected in 2016. Galea served as president of the IAPHS until he was succeeded in 2017 by current president Bruce Link (University of California, Riverside). In 2016, David Nash of Thomas Jefferson University wrote, "What is fascinating about [the IAPHS] is its commitment to an interdisciplinary population-based approach to health and healthcare. From IAPHS's perspective, population health means everything from improving children's lives to help them become healthy adults, to building healthier community environments, and even to changing discriminatory policies in the public sector."
