= Koyasan University =

Coordinates: 34°12′43″N 135°35′06″E

- 高野山大学
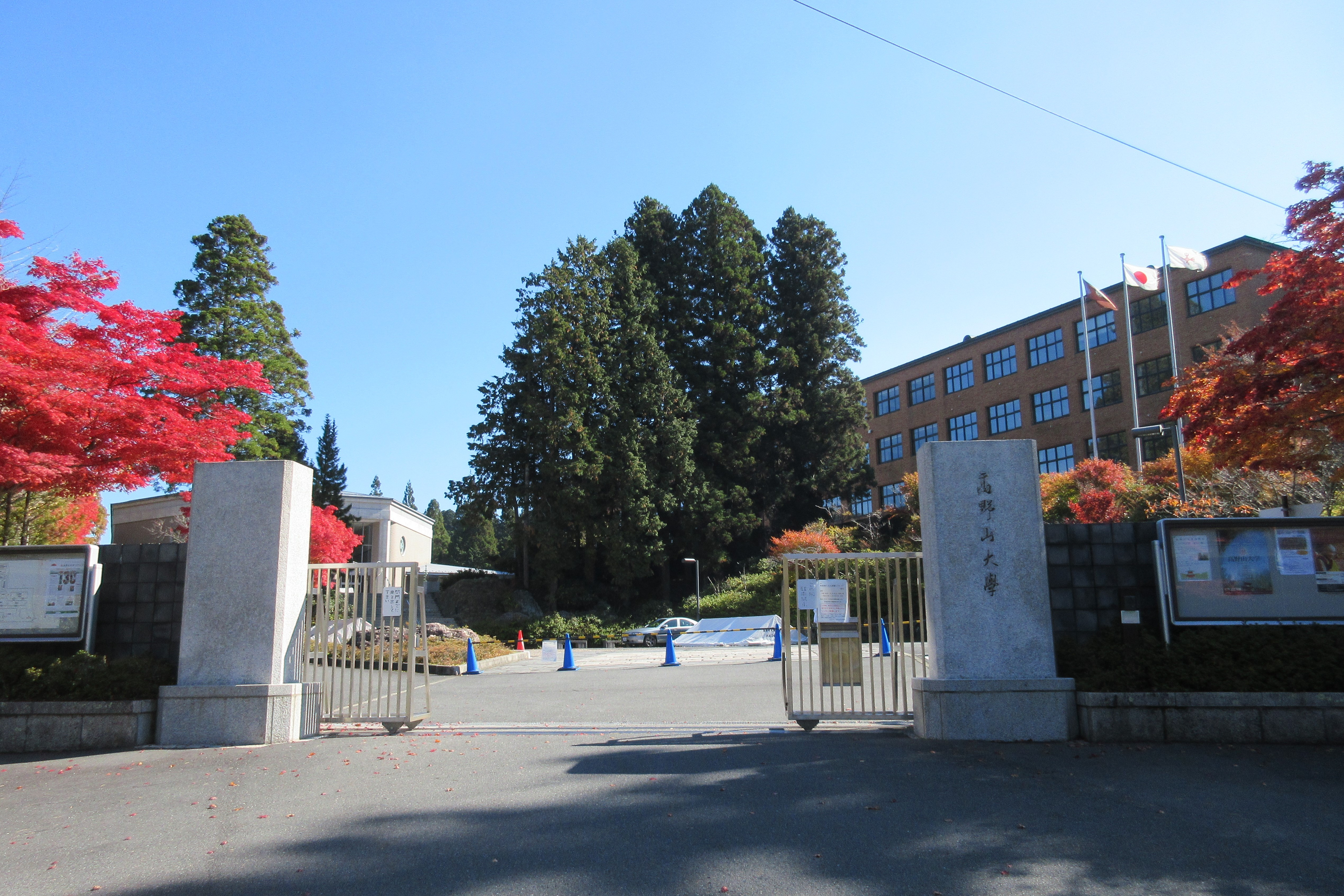
- Koyasan University Main Gate
- Type: Private
- Religious affiliation: Shingon Buddhism
- Academic staff: 18
- Students: 323
- Location: Koyasan, Wakayama Prefecture, Japan

Koyasan University (高野山大学, Kōyasan daigaku) is a private university in Mount Kōya, Wakayama Prefecture, Japan. The predecessor of the school was established in 1886 as a monastic school for Shingon Buddhist monks, and it was chartered as a university in 1926. In addition to its main campus, Koyasan University also operates a satellite school for working adults in Osaka.

== Academics ==
The university has strong ties to the Shingon sect of Buddhism and follows the educational principles of Kobodaishi Kūkai, the founder of Shingon. Historically, Koayasan University has largely specialized in training Buddhist monks, which includes operating a monastery for its students. However, in recent years the university has sought to diversify its curriculum and attract students who aspire to be teachers and social workers.

Koayasan University is notable for its library containing a range of rare manuscripts on Buddhism and other religions in Japan and East Asia, including several designated as National Important Cultural Property, and the library building itself being listed as tangible cultural property.

=== Departments ===
- Department of Esoteric Buddhism
- Department of Humanistic Anthropology
- Graduate School (offers both an on-site and a distance learning MA program, as well as a PhD program)
- The Institute of Esoteric Culture (research institute)
- Library

== Notable people ==
=== Faculty ===
- Shizuteru Ueda, philosopher
- Joseph Kitagawa, religious scholar
- Tomokichi Fukurai, psychologist and early proponent of parapsychology

=== Alumni ===
- Ekan Ikeguchi, Buddhist priest
- Kōyū Amano, monk, artist, and radio personality
- Shinzō Mitsuda(ja), novelist, winner of the Honkaku Mystery Award
- Shōko Ieda, non-fiction writer known for her controversial depictions of sexuality
- Eken Mine, actor and voice actor

== See also ==
- Statue of B. R. Ambedkar (Japan)
