= Anne Rose Kitagawa =

American curator (born 1965)

- Born: 1965 (age 60–61)
- Occupation: Curator
- Parents: Joseph Kitagawa (father); Evelyn Mae Rose (mother)

Anne Rose Kitagawa (born 1965) is the chief curator of collections and Asian art and director of academic programs at the Jordan Schnitzer Museum of Art at the University of Oregon. She is an authority of the Harvard Art Museums' Tale of Genji album.

== Early life and family ==
Anne Rose Kitagawa was born in 1965 to Joseph Kitagawa of Japan, and Evelyn Mae Rose of Hanford, California, who was of Portuguese Catholic descent. Her father travelled to the United States in order to study at the Church Divinity School of the Pacific but was interned after the attack on Pearl Harbor as an enemy alien. He became an ordained minister while interned and was transferred to the Minidoka War Relocation Center in Idaho where he met his future wife who was a sociologist working for the United States government doing statistical research. The couple were married after the Second World War after which Evelyn was disowned by her parents and never had contact with them again.

Kitagawa spoke some words of Japanese at home as a child but did not learn to speak the language fluently until she was at college.

== Career ==
Kitagawa's interest in Asian art was kindled by travelling to Japan and Asia as a child with her parents. Informed by her father's criticism of the way much Asian art has been presented in purely aesthetic terms, even in Asia, Kitagawa has sought to approach Asian art by placing in its original cultural context and examining the rituals behind the works of art.

Kitagawa worked for the Museum of Fine Arts in Boston and at the Art Institute of Chicago, before becoming the Cunningham assistant curator of Japanese art at the Arthur M. Sackler Museum at Harvard University. She joined the Jordan Schnitzer museum at the University of Oregon in 2010, where she is chief curator of collections and Asian art and director of academic programs.

In 2016, Kitagawa contributed the introduction to a new edition The Tale of Genji by the Folio Society based on the translation by Royall Tyler and illustrations from the Genji album in the Harvard Art Museums.

== Selected publications ==
- Symbol and substance: The Elaine Ehrenkranz Collection of Japanese lacquer boxes: Harvard University Art Museums, Arthur M. Sackler Museum, 26 September 1998 to 3 January 1999. Harvard University Art Museums, 1998.
- Behind the scenes of Harvard's "Tale of Genji album". Apollo, 2001, 477, pp. 28–35.
- "Introduction" in The Tale of Genji by Murasaki Shikibu. Folio Society, London, 2016.
