= Stig-9 =

Stig-9 is a self-report questionnaire to measure perceived mental illness stigma. It assesses the extent to which respondents expect negative societal beliefs, feelings, and behaviors towards people who are supposed to have a mental disorder.

== The construct ==
Perceived mental illness stigma is a psychological construct. It is a key component of the modified labeling theory. According to this theory, negative societal beliefs about people with mental disorders are part of western culture (e.g. people with mental disorders are seen as being less trustworthy, weak, less intelligent, and dangerous). As a product of socialization, individuals familiarize themselves with these beliefs, and - to a certain degree - expect negative attitudes, feelings and behaviors towards people with mental disorders (for example rejection when applying for a job, or reluctance to enter into a close relationship).

== The questionnaire ==
The Stig-9 questionnaire consists of nine items and one example item. On a four-point Likert scale, respondents indicate the degree to which they expect negative societal beliefs, feelings, and behaviors towards someone who has been treated for a mental disorder. Response categories are:

- disagree [0]
- somewhat disagree [1]
- somewhat agree [2]
- agree [3]

The item responses are summarized in a sum score (range 0-27 points). "High scores on Stig-9 correspond with high expectations of negative societal beliefs, feelings, and behaviors towards 'mentally ill' people."

== Psychometric properties ==
The psychometric properties were analyzed in a study conducted at the University Medical Center Hamburg-Eppendorf in Germany. The authors surveyed a large clinical sample of approximately 1,000 patients at the Department of Psychosomatic Medicine and Psychotherapy. They found excellent item- and scale characteristics, high internal consistency, and evidence for validity. In addition, they determined reference scores for the study population. Currently, a manuscript that describes the development and psychometric evaluation of Stig-9 is under review for publication in a scientific journal.

== See also ==
- Mental disorder
- Labeling theory
- Social stigma
- Likert scale
- Psychometrics
