= Bruce Link =

American epidemiologist and sociologist

- Born: Bruce George Link; September 3, 1949 (age 76); Denver, Colorado, U.S.
- Education: Earlham College; Columbia University
- Known for: Health disparities Psychiatric epidemiology Social stigma Theory of fundamental causes
- Awards: Robert Wood Johnson Foundation Investigator Award in Health Policy Research (1995)
- Scientific career
- Fields: Epidemiology; Sociology
- Institutions: Columbia University; University of California, Riverside
- Thesis: Mental patient status and social disability: an examination of the effects of a psychiatric label (1980)
- Doctoral advisor: Bruce Dohrenwend

Bruce George Link (born September 3, 1949) is an American epidemiologist and sociologist who is a Distinguished Professor of Sociology and Public Policy at the University of California, Riverside. He is also a professor emeritus of Epidemiology and Sociomedical Sciences in the Mailman School of Public Health at Columbia University, a research scientist at the New York State Psychiatric Institute, and the current president of the Interdisciplinary Association for Population Health Science (IAPHS). Bruce Link is probably best known for developing fundamental cause theory of social inequalities in health together with Jo Phelan.

== Early life and education ==
Born in Denver, Colorado, Link is the son of Eugene P. Link and his wife, Beulah Meyer Link. He graduated from Earlham College in 1971 with a B.A. in sociology, and received his Ph.D. and M.S. from Columbia University in 1980 and 1982, respectively.

== Career ==
Link first joined the faculty of Columbia University in 1981 as an assistant professor of public health. He was promoted to associate professor and full professor at Columbia in 1988 and 1998, respectively. He left the faculty of Columbia in 2015 to become a professor at the University of California, Riverside.

== Honors and awards ==
In 1995, Link received an Investigator Award in Health Policy Research from the Robert Wood Johnson Foundation. In 2002, he was elected to the Institute of Medicine; he received the Leonard I. Pearlin Award for Distinguished Contributions to the Sociological Study of Mental Health from the American Sociological Association the same year. In 2007, he received both the Leo G. Reeder Award from the American Sociological Association and the Rema Lapouse Award from the American Public Health Association.
