= Joseph Kitagawa =

American academic (1915–1992)

Joseph Mitsuo Kitagawa
- Born: Mitsuo Kitagawa; March 8, 1915; Osaka Prefecture, Japan
- Died: October 7, 1992 (aged 77); Chicago, Illinois, U.S.
- Occupations: Priest, Professor, Educator

Education
- Education: University of Chicago (PhD)
- Alma mater: University of Chicago

Philosophical work
- Notable works: On Understanding Japanese Religion, Religions of the East, Religion in Japanese History, The History of Religions
- Notable ideas: a world of meaning

Joseph Mitsuo Kitagawa (March 8, 1915 – October 7, 1992) was an eminent Japanese American scholar in religious studies. He was professor emeritus and dean of the University of Chicago Divinity School. He is considered one of the founders of the field of the history of religions. He is known for his contributions to the study of religious traditions in Asia and intercultural understanding of the East and the West.

Kitagawa was born in Osaka Prefecture. He graduated from Rikkyo University in Tokyo in 1937. He came to the United States to study theology in 1941. During World War II, Kitagawa was interned at the Minidoka War Relocation Center at Hunt, Idaho, where he remained until October 1945. He received his B.D. from Seabury-Western Theological Seminary in 1947. He earned his Ph.D. from the University of Chicago and joined the faculty of the Divinity School in 1951. He became a U.S. citizen in 1955.

Kitagawa was a founding editor of History of Religions. He served as president of the American Society for the Study of Religions from 1960 to 1972 and Vice President of the International Association for the History of Religions from 1975 to 1985. He was a visiting professor at the University of California at Santa Barbara, the University of Tokyo, and Koyasan University.

His wife, Evelyn M. Kitagawa, was a sociologist, and his daughter, Anne Rose Kitagawa, became a notable curator of Asian art.

== Early life and internment: 1915–1951 ==
On March 8, 1915, Kitagawa was born to Christian Japanese parents in the city of Osaka. His father was an Episcopal priest and as a youth he grew up in a parsonage with a minority community of Christians in Japan. As a child, Kitagawa was friends with other children who were sons and daughters of people within Buddhist, Shinto, and Christian clergies. This exposure to multiple religions at a young age made Kitagawa understand the importance of religion. In his formative years, Kitagawa was inspired and fascinated by the lives of Confucius and the Apostle Paul. Since Kitagawa grew up in the Far East during the early to mid 20th century, he was taught at a young age who Confucius was and what ideals he stood for. Kitagawa was especially impacted by Confucius' teachings on common human nature, the educability of all men and women, ethical universalism, and the vocation of training scholars. Due to his father's involvement with the Episcopal church, at a young age Kitagawa was exposed to the names of many apostles and the Apostle Paul was the name which stuck with him most. Before Kitagawa began to read and understand the teachings of the Apostle Paul, he liked Paul because his sisters disliked Paul on the grounds that Paul was a "woman-hater". In 1933, Kitagawa began his studies at Tokyo's Rikkyo University, and it was here where he became intrigued by the personality and insights of the Apostle Paul. Kitagawa was interested by how Paul maintained his vocation to spreading the gospel despite his constantly changing mood and his array of common human weaknesses. Kitagawa claimed that he did not fully comprehend the teachings of Confucius or the Apostle Paul, but to him both of these scholars stand as a testament to how people should measure the worth of a person based on their quality of vocation as opposed to their past accomplishments. While in Rikkyo University, Kitagawa studied theology and took the steps to become an Episcopal priest. In 1937, Kitagawa graduated from university, gained his B.A. degree, and moved to the United States for continued theological study.

World War II began while Kitagawa pursued a B.D. degree at the Church Divinity School of the Pacific in Berkeley, so before he was able to complete his studies he was moved to a War Relocation Center. Kitagawa was traumatized by life in the camps and noted that he had countless sleepless nights even after being released from the Idaho center in October 1945. That said, Kitagawa did not bear resentment to the United States. Instead he felt disappointed in America's inability to uphold core democratic values. Following his release, Kitagawa began working with the Episcopal church to help displaced Japanese Americans resettle into society. At the same time, he began working under Joachim Wach, a German religious scholar, at the University of Chicago Divinity School. He helped Wach develop and launch the first American branch of Religionswissenschaft, which is now known as the History of Religions. After completing his dissertation, titled "Kobo-daishi and Shingon Buddhism", Kitagawa went on to receive his degree and become an instructor at the University of Chicago Divinity school in 1951.

== Experience in academia: 1951–1984 ==
After teaching at the University of Chicago Divinity School for four years, Kitagawa's mentor, Joachim Wach, died due to illness when he was visiting his family in Europe. Following Wach's death, Kitagawa became the leader of the History of Religions discipline in the University of Chicago Divinity School. Ever since Kitagawa became the head of the History of Religions department, he devoted himself to helping his students learn when to form study groups, learn when they are prepared to take Ph.D. candidacy exams, and learn how to further the History of Religions discipline in various job roles and fields. Kitagawa also began translating and publishing Wach's earlier essays which were all completely in German. Between 1951 and 1970, Kitagawa authored and edited no less than 23 books and over 170 academic articles. Among them, his works on Asian and Japanese Religions, such as Religion in Japanese History and On Understanding Japanese Religion, are most well known. One of his first major accomplishments was the securing of Mircea Eliade and Charles H. Long as instructors within the History of Religions discipline. Within the field of the History of Religions, Eliade made significant contributions to the understanding of Alchemy, Shamanism, Yoga, and an idea Eliade referred to as the "eternal return". Long was a distinguished scholar who specialized in Black religions and wrote a landmark piece titled Significations: Signs, Symbols, and Images in the Interpretation of Religion (1986) which explored issues relating to religion in the context of cultural misunderstandings, creation, and encounter. Kitagawa, Eliade, and Long founded the journal titled History of Religions in 1960, which was the first journal completely devoted to the study of comparative religious history. In 1970, Kitagawa had successfully developed the History of Religions discipline, and the University of Chicago asked him to take on a leadership role in the Divinity School itself. Kitagawa became dean of the University of Chicago Divinity School in 1970 and during this time Kitagawa developed strong relations with the Lutheran School of Theology, Catholic Theological Union, and McCormick Theological Seminary. In 1980, Kitagawa retired his position as dean and in 1984 he developed pneumonia which damaged his speech so Kitagawa withdrew himself from the public sphere.

== Retirement from academia: 1984–1992 ==
After developing pneumonia, Kitagawa began reflecting on his own life in academic essay collections such as The Christian Tradition Beyond Its European Captivity and The Quest for Human Unity: a Religious History. In The Christian Tradition Beyond Its European Captivity, Kitagawa discusses what it was like to grow up in a Christian community in Asia and what he experienced as a Japanese American during the time of Japanese internment camps and relocation centers. In The Quest for Human Unity: a Religious History, Kitagawa writes about his journey in academia and his life-long quest to create a system which recognizes humanity's continuities while simultaneously appreciating humanity's vast cultural diversity. Between 1984 and 1992, Kitagawa published five academic essays. On October 7, 1992, Kitagawa died of pneumonia and health complications related to a stroke he had the preceding January. Before his death, Kitagawa planned out his own memorial service, and on November 2, 1992 Kitagawa's memorial service was held in the Rockefeller Chapel where the liturgy of the 1928 Book of Common Prayer was played and no eulogies were given.

== Books ==
- Kitagawa, J. M. (1966). Religion in Japanese history. New York, NY: Columbia University Press.
- Kitagawa, J. M. (1968). Religions of the East. Philadelphia, PA: Westminster Press.
- Kitagawa, J. M. (1987). On understanding Japanese religion. Princeton, NJ: Princeton University Press.
- Kitagawa, J. M. (1987). The history of religions: Understanding human experience. Atlanta, GA: Scholars Press.
- Kitagawa, J. M. (1990). Spiritual liberation and human freedom in contemporary Asia. New York, NY: Peter Lang.
- Kitagawa, J. M. (1990). The quest for human unity: A religious history. Minneapolis, MN: Fortress Press.
- Kitagawa, J. M. (1992). Religious studies, theological studies, and the university-divinity school. Atlanta, GA: Scholars Press.
- Kitagawa, J. M. (1992). The Christian tradition: Beyond European captivity. Philadelphia, PA: Trinity Press International.

== Edited books ==
- Kitagawa, J. M. (Ed.). (1959). Modern trends in world religions. La Salle, IL: Open Court.
- Kitagawa, J. M. (Ed.). (1969). Understanding modern China. Chicago, IL: Quadrangle Books.
- Kitagawa, J. M. (Ed.). (1984). American refugee policy: Ethical and religious reflections. Minneapolis, MN: Winston Press.
- Kitagawa, J. M. (Ed.). (1985). The history of religions: Retrospect and prospect. New York, NY: Macmillan.
- Kitagawa, J. M. (Ed.). (1989). The religious traditions of Asia. New York, NY: Macmillan.
- Kitagawa, J. M., & Cummings, M. D. (Eds.). (1989). Buddhism and Asian history. New York, NY: Macmillan.
- Kitagawa, J. M., & Long, C. H. (Eds.). (1969). Myths and symbols: Studies in honor of Mircea Eliade. Chicago, IL: University of Chicago Press.
- Eliade, M., & Kitagawa, J. M. (Eds.). (1959). The history of religions: Essays in methodology. Chicago, IL: University of Chicago Press.
