= Tracy L. Cross =

Educational psychologist

Tracy Cross
- Born: 1958 (age 67–68); Tennessee, United States
- Education: University of Tennessee, Knoxville
- Scientific career
- Fields: Psychology, Gifted Education
- Workplaces: College of William & Mary, Ball State University

Tracy L. Cross (born 1958, in Tennessee, United States) is an educational psychologist and developmental scientist. Since 2009 he has held the Jody and Layton Smith Professor of Psychology and Gifted Education endowed chair at The College of William & Mary, has been the executive director for William & Mary's Center for Gifted Education (CFGE), and founded the Institute for Research on the Suicide of Gifted Students in 2012. Previously he served as the George and Frances Ball Distinguished Professor of Psychology and Gifted Studies Ball State University (2000–2009), the founder and executive director of both the Center for Gifted Studies and Talent Development (2003–2009), and the Institute for Research on the Psychology of Gifted Students (2007–2009).

Over forty years, he made important contributions to the field of gifted education, including the development of the school-based conception of giftedness, the information management model, and the continuum of visibility, and was also influential in applying social-cognitive theory and stigma theory to gifted children, and created an ecological model of suicidal behavior of gifted students.

== Career ==
He is the executive director of the Center for Gifted Education, and President Emeriti of the National Association for Gifted Children (NAGC). Cross has published well over 300 articles and book chapters, and 14 books. He has been the editor of five journals in the field of gifted education (Gifted Child Quarterly, Roeper Review, Journal of Secondary Gifted Education, Research Briefs, and Journal for the Education of the Gifted.), and is the current editor of SENGJ: Exploring the Psychology of Giftedness.

== Academic work ==
Cross's research interests include the social and emotional lives of gifted children, the psychology of gifted children including personality differences, the phenomenology of giftedness, and suicidology concerns of gifted individuals. His long-time collaboration with Dr. Laurence J. Coleman has resulted in many articles and two books. Coleman had adapted Erving Goffman's (1963) social stigma theory to gifted children, providing a rationale for why children may hide their abilities and present alternate identities to their peers. The first edition of Coleman and Cross's book, Being Gifted In School, is a widely cited reference in the field of gifted education. In the chapter on Coping with Giftedness, the authors expanded on the theory first presented in a 1988 article. According to Google Scholar, this article has been cited at least 220 times in the academic literature.

=== The Stigma Paradigm of Giftedness ===
Erving Goffman's (1963) social stigma theory describes stigmatizing conditions as those attributes which do not conform to the expectations of society and result in social disapproval. Coleman and Cross identified giftedness as a stigmatizing condition, based on research with gifted students and, in part, on a book that was written and edited by 20 teenage, gifted individuals. Psychologists had already known that adolescence is a time of identity development in which children struggle with the desire to have a unique identity yet still conform to the expectations of society. The fact that children viewed their own giftedness as a stigmatizing condition was a new perspective. Being gifted sets students apart from their peers and this differentness interferes with full social acceptance. Different social expectations that exist in the various social contexts that children must navigate and the value judgements that may be assigned to the child result in the child's use of social coping strategies to manage his or her identity. Unlike other stigmatizing conditions, giftedness is a unique type of differentness because it can lead to praise or ridicule depending on the audience and circumstances. Gifted children learn when it is safe for them to display their giftedness and when they should hide their giftedness to better fit in with a group.

=== The Information Management Model (IMM) ===
The Information Management Model (IMM) is a model of the process by which children decide to employ coping strategies to manage their identities. This model is based on Bandura's (1986) social-cognitive framework and Goffman's work on the management of identity. In situations where the child feels different, she or he may decide to manage the information that others know about him or her. Strategies include: disidentification with giftedness, trying to maintain a very low visibility (invisibility), or creating a high-visibility identity (playing a stereotypical role associated with giftedness). This range of strategies is called the Continuum of Visibility.

== Achievements and awards ==
In 2009, Cross received the lifetime achievement award from Mensa in recognition of a lifetime of contributions to the field of intelligence and related subjects. Mensa had previously recognized his work with four Mensa Outstanding Research Awards, one in 2008 and two in 2007.

Cross has received the Distinguished Service Award from the Association for the Gifted and NAGC (2007), the Early Leader Award (1996), Early Scholar Award, and Distinguished Scholar Awards from NAGC (1997).
