= Philip Hauser =

American sociologist (1909–1994)

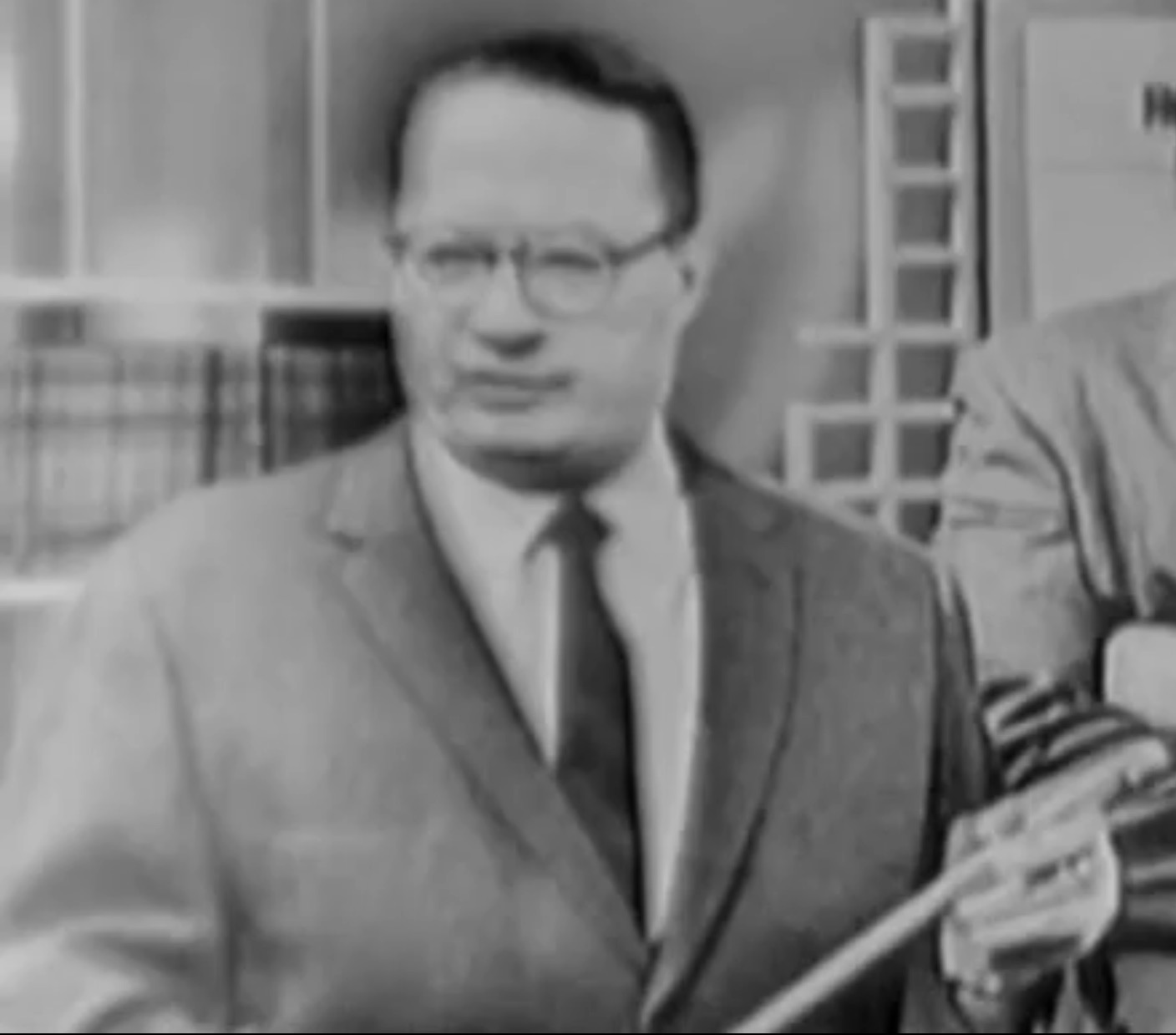
- Philip Hauser in 1960 at age 51
- Born: September 27, 1909; Chicago, Illinois, U.S.
- Died: December 13, 1994 (aged 85); Chicago, Illinois, U.S.
- Education: University of Chicago
- Occupation: Demographer
- Years active: 1932 — c. 1973
- Known for: founder of the Population Research Center at the University of Chicago, over which he served as director for some 30 years.
- Notable work: See Publications

Philip Morris Hauser (September 27, 1909 – December 13, 1994) was a demographer and pioneer in urban studies who was a president of the American Sociological Association, the American Statistical Association and the Population Association of America. For more than 30 years he was director of the Population Research Center at the University of Chicago where he also served as the Lucy Flower Professor of Urban Sociology.

== Early life ==
Philip Morris Hauser was born September 27, 1909. He attended the University of Chicago and received a Bachelor's degree in 1929. He was studying at Chicago at the time of the rise of the Chicago School of Sociology.

== Career ==
In 1932, Hauser was first named as an instructor at the University of Chicago, a position which he retained throughout the course of his graduate studies. In 1933 he was awarded a Master's degree from that institution, followed by a Ph.D. in Sociology in 1938. From 1934 to 1937, Hauser went on leave to serve as a researcher for the Federal Emergency Relief Administration. Hauser worked at the United States Census Bureau from 1938 to 1947, first as Assistant Chief Statistician for Population then taking on the role of Deputy Director in 1946. In 1944 he was elected as a Fellow of the American Statistical Association. In 1947, Hauser returned to the University of Chicago as a professor of sociology. He also remained as acting director of the Census Bureau from 1949 to 1950. Hauser was elected to the American Philosophical Society in 1965, the American Academy of Arts and Sciences in 1972, and the United States National Academy of Sciences in 1976. Hauser was the founder of the Population Research Center at the University of Chicago, over which he served as director for some 30 years. During the course of his career there he helped train approximately 100 future PhDs, in addition to a large number of other graduate students.

== Death ==
Hauser died on December 13, 1994. He was 85 years old at the time of his death.

== Publications ==
- "Differential Mortality in the United States: A Study in Socioeconomic Epidemiology." With E. Kitagawa. 1973.
- Philip Houser, "Urbanization: An Overview", The Study of Urbanization. Philip Hauser & Leo Schnore (Comps.), John Wiley and J. Sons. Inc. 1963.
