= Evelyn M. Kitagawa =

American sociologist and demographer

- Born: Evelyn Mae Rose; 1920; Hanford, California, U.S.
- Died: September 15, 2007 (aged 86–87); Chicago, Illinois, U.S.
- Occupations: Sociologist, demographer, professor
- Known for: Kitagawa decomposition
- Spouse: Joseph Kitagawa
- Children: Anne Rose Kitagawa

Academic background
- Education: University of California, Berkeley; University of Chicago (PhD)
- Thesis: Differentials in Total and Marital Fertility, Chicago 1920-1940 (1951)

Evelyn Mae Kitagawa (1920 – September 15, 2007) was an American sociologist and demographer who worked as a professor at the University of Chicago and became president of the Population Association of America and chair of the U.S. Census Bureau's Advisory Committee on Population Statistics. She is known for her book with Philip Hauser, Differential Mortality in the United States: A Study in Socioeconomic Epidemiology, which discovered systematic correlations between the death rates of Americans and their income and level of education. Kitagawa wrote the first paper on decomposing statistics into components associated with the joint movement of the levels and returns to predictors, known as Kitagawa decomposition.

== Biography ==
She was born as Evelyn Mae Rose, in 1920 in Hanford, California, to a family of Portuguese Catholic descent. After earning a bachelor's degree in mathematics from the University of California, Berkeley in 1941, she began working for the War Relocation Authority, which ran the internment camps of Japanese-Americans during World War II, as head of its statistics unit. In one of the camps, she met her future husband, Joseph Mitsuo Kitagawa, who had come to the US in 1941 as a divinity student and became an Episcopalian minister while interned. After marrying him, her family disowned her and she lost contact with them.

Kitagawa earned her Ph.D. from the University of Chicago in 1951. She worked for a local urban research center, and then became an assistant professor at Chicago in 1954. She stayed there for the rest of her career, with a promotion to full professor in 1970, until her 1989 retirement. Her husband also worked at Chicago, as professor of history of religions and dean of the divinity school.

Her honors included election as a fellow of the American Sociological Association (1959) and American Statistical Association (1968).

Her daughter, Anne Rose Kitagawa, is notable as a curator of Asian art.

== Bibliography ==
=== Books ===
- Differential Mortality in the United States: A Study in Socioeconomic Epidemiology (1973)

=== Journal articles ===
- "Components of a Difference Between Two Rates", Journal of the American Statistical Association.
