= Jo Phelan =

American sociologist

Jo C. Phelan
- Education: University of California; State University of New York at Stony Brook
- Known for: Theory of fundamental causes
- Awards: Robert Wood Johnson Foundation Health Policy Investigator Award (1996); Russell Sage Foundation Visiting Scholar (2012–13)
- Scientific career
- Fields: Sociology
- Institutions: Mailman School of Public Health
- Thesis: Gender differences in equity at work (1991)
- Doctoral advisor: Judith Tanur

Jo Carol Phelan is a Special Research Scientist in the Department of Sociomedical Sciences and co-director of the Center for the Study of Social Inequalities and Health at Columbia University's Mailman School of Public Health. She is known for working with Bruce Link to develop the theory of fundamental causes of social inequalities in health. She was a Russell Sage Foundation Visiting Scholar from 2012 to 2013. She also received a Health Policy Investigator Award from the Robert Wood Johnson Foundation in 1996, and the 1999 book Handbook of the Sociology of Mental Health, which she co-edited, received the prize for best publication from the American Sociological Association's Section of the Sociology of Mental Health.
