= Ronald Oaxaca =

American economist (born c. 1943)

Ronald L. Oaxaca
- Born: c. 1943 (age 82–83)

Academic background
- Education: Princeton University; California State University, Fresno
- Doctoral advisors: Albert Rees; Daniel S. Hamermesh

Academic work
- Discipline: Labor economics
- Institutions: University of Arizona
- Website: Information at IDEAS / RePEc

Ronald L. Oaxaca (/wɑːˈhɑːkɑː/; born c. 1943) is an American economist and McClelland Professor of Economics at the University of Arizona. His areas of research include labor economics, applied econometrics and applied microeconomics. He is known for the Blinder–Oaxaca decomposition.

Oaxaca graduated from California State University, Fresno in 1965, and went on to earn a Ph.D. from Princeton University in 1971.

== Background ==
Oaxaca conducts research on panel data analysis of faculty salary determination. He has been engaged in research on statistical discrimination, consistent estimators of linear probability models, the effects of ability and family background on optimal schooling levels, a labor supply model of dual job holding, the production of engineering degrees in American universities, the effects of technological change on gender wage differentials, and comparative trends in gender wage differentials between Denmark and the U.S.

Oaxaca is perhaps best known for his Blinder–Oaxaca decomposition procedure which attempts to identify the presence of labour market discrimination against particular groups. In this technique, which was introduced in his doctoral thesis at Princeton University and eventually published in 1973, separate statistical models of labour market outcomes (typically wage rates) are estimated for two different groups of workers. The modelling procedure allows the researcher to hypothesize what the wage of the discriminated-against group would be if discrimination were absent from the labour market.

In 2005 Hispanic Business magazine identified Ronald Oaxaca as one of the 100 Most Influential Hispanics in the United States. The Oaxaca decomposition is used worldwide to sort out claims of discrimination in salaries and wages. The Oaxaca decomposition has been cited in hundreds of published research papers and in countless discrimination lawsuits.
