= Kōyū Amano =

Japanese Buddhist monk

Kōyū Amano (天野 高雄, 1968 - present) is a Japanese Buddhist monk of Kōyasan Shingon-shū. He currently serves as abbot at Kōzō-ji (高蔵寺) in Okayama Prefecture and has been active as a missionary, artist, sculptor and radio personality.

== Life ==
Amano was born in Kurashiki city as the eldest son of ex-photographer Masao Amano. In his youth, he studied oil painting and shodō and developed hobbies such as playing trumpet and softball. He traveled to Tokyo with the purpose of becoming a comedian, but was turned away from the opportunity.

At the recommendation of his grandfather Yūen Amano, then 15th abbot, he enrolled in Koyasan High School and later entered Koyasan University where he graduated from the Department of Esoteric Buddhism (密教学科). Immediately after his grandfather's passing, Amano took over as 16th abbot of the temple.

Today, Amano proselytizes Buddhism through his art and local radio show.

== Family ==
Amano has one younger brother, Yukio Amano who is supervisor of Japan Mononoke Tourist (日本物怪観光; Nihon mononoke kankō), an art unit that aims at spreading information about Japanese yōkai.

== Bibliography ==
=== As primary author ===
- Hohoemi Hotoke (ほほえみほとけ) (2002)
- Anata de Nakereba (あなたでなければ) (2004)
- Ima shika nai yo (今しかないよ) (2004)
- Hitasura (ひたすらに) (2010)
- Hohoemisoete (ほほえみそえて) (2010)
- Tsuchi Hotoke (土ほとけ) (2012)
- Hotokesama no Hohoemi Kirie (仏さまのほほえみ切り絵) (2015)
- Kotoba no Omamori (ことばのお守り)

=== As co-author ===
- Rokudai no Hibiki〜Odaishisama no Kotoba (六大の響き〜お大師さまのことば) by Riyōei Fukuda (2012) (Illustrator)
- Chiisana Kokoro kara Nukedasu Obōsan no Ichinichi Ippun Seppō (小さな心から抜け出す お坊さんの1日1分説法) by Higan-ji (2013)
