= Guilty pleasure =

Type of pleasure that one holds for something despite it not being held in high regard

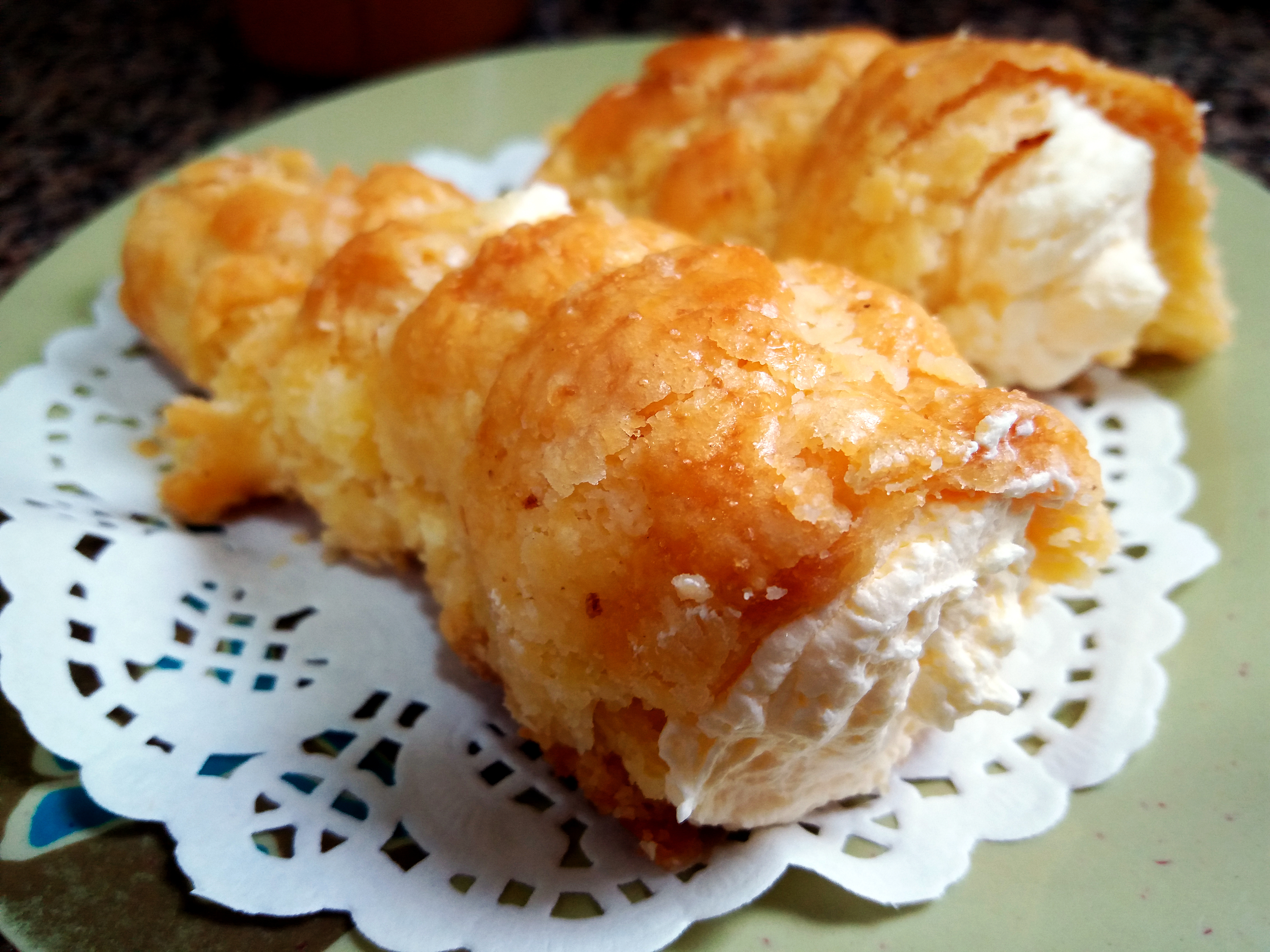
Fresh cream cakes were marketed as "naughty but nice" in a 1980s British advertising campaign.

A guilty pleasure is something, such as an activity or a piece of media, that one enjoys despite understanding that it is not generally held in high regard or is seen as unusual. For example, a person may secretly enjoy a film while acknowledging that the film is poorly made or generally regarded unfavorably.

The term can also be used to refer to a taste for foods that are considered to be advisable to avoid, especially for health reasons. For example, coffee, alcoholic beverages, smoking and chocolate after dinner are considered by many to be guilty pleasures.

== History ==
George Orwell, in his essay "Rudyard Kipling" (1942), describes the poetry of Kipling as "almost a shameful pleasure".

== See also ==
- Guilt
- Peer pressure
- Shame
