= Vicarious embarrassment =

Feeling of embarrassment from observing the embarrassing actions of another person

Vicarious embarrassment (also known as secondhand, empathetic, or third-party embarrassment and also as Spanish shame or Fremdscham (noun)/fremdschämen (verb) in German) is the feeling of embarrassment from observing the embarrassing actions of another person. Unlike general embarrassment, vicarious embarrassment is not the feelings of embarrassment for oneself or for one's own actions, but instead by feeling embarrassment for somebody else after witnessing (verbally and/or visually) that other person experience an embarrassing event. These emotions can be perceived as pro-social, and some say they can be seen as motives for following socially and culturally acceptable behaviour.

Vicarious embarrassment (German: Fremdscham) is often seen as an opposite to schadenfreude, which is the feeling of pleasure or satisfaction at misfortune, humiliation or embarrassment of another person.

Vicarious embarrassment is different from an emotional contagion, which is when a person unconsciously mimics the emotions that others are experiencing. An emotional contagion is experienced by both people, making it a shared emotion. Vicarious embarrassment often occurs even when the individual experiencing the embarrassing event might not be aware of the implications. For an act to be considered an emotional contagion, more than one person must be affected by the emotion, but in vicarious emotions, it is only necessary that the observer experience the emotion. Furthermore, vicarious embarrassment can be experienced even when the observer is completely isolated.

Vicarious embarrassment, like other vicarious emotions, presents symptoms that reflect the original emotion. However, unlike shared emotions, the experience of embarrassment for the observer is dependent on how they normally experience embarrassment. Individuals who experience social anxiety in their own life may experience the familiar symptoms of blushing, excess sweating, trembling, palpitations, and nausea. Other, less severe symptoms may include cringing, looking away, or general discomfort.

== Psychological basis ==
=== Empathy ===
Vicarious embarrassment, also known as empathetic embarrassment, is intrinsically linked to empathy. Empathy is the ability to understand the feelings of another and is considered a highly reinforcing emotion to promote selflessness, prosocial behaviour, and group emotion, whereas a lack of empathy is related to antisocial behaviour. During an embarrassing situation, the observer empathises with the victim of embarrassment, assuming the feeling of embarrassment. People who have more empathy are more likely to be susceptible to vicarious embarrassment. The capacity to recognize emotions is probably innate, as it may be achieved unconsciously.

=== Self-projection ===
Psychological projection is a theory in psychology and psychoanalysis in which humans defend themselves against undesirable emotions by denying their existence in themselves while attributing them to others. Projection is considered a normal and common process in everyday life. Vicarious embarrassment and other vicarious emotions, however, work in the reverse, a process called self-projection. The undesirable emotion is experienced in another person, and the observer projects what they interpret as the appropriate response onto themselves. For example, someone who lies easily might feel vicariously embarrassed if they self-project the experience of someone getting caught in a bad lie.

== Cultural significance ==
Embarrassing situations often arise in social situations, as the result of failing to meet a social expectation, and is used to help learn what has been deemed culturally appropriate. While embarrassment isolates the victim based on a cultural bias, vicarious embarrassment is used to promote prosocial behavior between the victim and the observer.

=== Cringe comedy ===
Embarrassing situations are used in situational comedy, sketch comedy, dramatic irony, and practical jokes. Traditionally, laugh tracks were used to help cue the audience to laugh at appropriate times. But as laugh tracks were removed from sitcoms, embarrassing situations on television were now accompanied by silence, creating a genre known as cringe comedy, which includes many critically acclaimed sitcom television shows, such as the British television series The Office.
