= Multiple audience dilemma =

The multiple audience dilemma is a communication theory that describes what happens when a person (or group) creates different images of themselves when communicating with different audiences. For example, a study investigated the behavior of participants who were instructed to portray themselves as a "nerd" to one group and a "party animal" to another.

Individuals engage in a network of ongoing relationships. The dilemma arises when a message is intended for different groups of people who may have varying levels of knowledge and understanding, different cultural backgrounds, diverse interests and expectations. Therefore, when the person and the different audiences meet together, the person must somehow present a common image that both audiences find acceptable. The multiple audience dilemma might happen through choosing to act in a specific way to convey a personality that matches both images of the self that both audiences are familiar with, as a way of compromising for both audiences without one or both. This is also known as the multiple audience problem, or the multiple audience predicament.

== Psychological mechanisms ==
Several underlying psychological mechanisms create conflicting goals and pressure on individuals to communicate effectively with multiple audiences.

The multiple audience dilemma highlights the complex nature of one's social identity, as well as the challenges one may face as they navigate through different social contexts and expectations. Consequently, when an individual communicates with different audiences, they may switch between these different social identities depending on the situation at hand or type of audience they are interacting with. There are often, however, conflicting norms and expectations held by the different groups. This creates a dilemma for the individual about how to communicate effectively with each audience. For example, one may act differently with their friends as compared to with their family, or one may act differently in a professional setting as compared to when they are with peers. This conflict often creates a psychological tension, known as cognitive dissonance, as the individual tries to maintain a sense of coherence in their behavior and identity while satisfying the expectations of the different groups. The individual may experience stress or anxiety as they try to balance such competing demands, which in turn is likely to impact their sense of self-worth and self-esteem.

Additionally, the Self-Presentation Theory, also known as impression management, suggests that people strategically present themselves in ways that are likely to be perceived favorably by their audience. In the case of the multiple audience dilemma, individuals may feel pressure to present themselves differently to each audience in order to meet their expectations and avoid negative evaluations. Moreover, the Attribution theory proposes that individuals make attributions about the causes of behavior based on their observations of others. In the case of the multiple audience dilemma, one may be concerned about how their behavior will be attributed by each audience, hence may adjust their behavior accordingly.

== Factors ==
The multiple audience dilemma can further be influenced by factors like cultural and social norms, individual personality traits as well as the power dynamics between the different groups. For instance, an individual from a collectivist culture may experience more pressure to conform to group expectations, while individuals with a strong need for individuality and social approval may experience anxiety in situations where their behavior is being judged by multiple audiences.

The biggest factors that researchers have found to affect the multiple audience dilemma were social anxiety and familiarity. Austin Lee Nichols and Catherine A. Cottrell studied the factors that affect how confident and successful people were in this dilemma. In this study, participants were assigned to be either an actor or part of an audience of two. In the known audience condition, actors met with two unfamiliar people and then later interacted with both of them at the same time. In the unknown audience condition, the actors interacted with the two audience members together without having met them individually first. The participants were then asked questions about the interactions. The researchers found that people are generally more confident in conveying different images of themselves when they are already familiar with the audiences versus interacting with unfamiliar audiences. The researchers also found that people that are socially anxious were found to be less successful in conveying a common image to different audiences at the same time than people that are not socially anxious. As a result of being unsuccessful in these situations, people that are socially anxious may experience increased anxiety in the future about these interactions. As having high confidence increases a person's ability to convey a certain impression of themselves in a social situation, people with social anxiety are more likely to be unsuccessful in this dilemma as they may falter under the social pressure.

Research was also conducted to assess gender differences in the multiple audience dilemma. A study by Corey L. Cook concluded that oftentimes multiple audience problems can be created that differed by gender because men and women have different self-presentation goals, especially in the context of the workplace. Another study conducted by Yu Kasagi and Ikuo Daibo examined the effect of gender on self-presentation in multiple audience situations. In this study, participants were tasked with having a brief conversation with an opposite-sex partner, and researchers later introduced a same-sex observer of the conversation. The researchers found that participants presented themselves to the opposite-sex as more physically attractive when they were not being observed versus being observed by the same-sex. The study also found that the participants presented themselves as more friendly and socially desirable when they were also being perceived by the same-sex. These studies show how the behavior of people can differ when presented with the multiple audience dilemma based on gender.

One study sought to examine if the multiple audience problem existed online, specifically on social networking sites like Facebook and Instagram. These platforms have provided users with a space to be simultaneously and continuously perceived my multiple audiences (friends, family, employers, etc.), making self-presentation and impression management a major part of everyday life. The study investigated and empirically substantiated four key factors that supported the existence of the multiple audience problem in the online space; users befriended multiple audiences, users believed that they were being viewed by different audiences, users believed that the perceptions that the different audiences held of them varied, and users did not segregate their audiences by using the 'grouping' function.

== Strategies ==
When faced with the multiple audience problem, there are certain interactional and communicational strategies that people can employ to help resolve the dilemma, namely, audience segregation, covert messaging, and role distancing.

Audience segregation is the phenomenon of separating the different audiences or groups of people in our lives from each other based on the role or image that we intend to convey to that specific audience. By segregating the audiences for which we have conflicting impressions or images that we wish to portray, it eliminates the pressure of trying to convey multiple images at the same time. One researcher coined this strategy as the 'first line of defense', and likened it to the 'flight' response from the popular 'fight or flight' paradigm.

== Research ==
There have been several studies investigating the multiple audience dilemma, wherein researchers examined the underlying psychological mechanisms and the impact of this phenomenon on individuals' behavior and well-being.

For instance, Charles F. Bond Jr, Rene M. Pauls and colleagues studied the psychology behind the multiple-audience predicament. Undergraduates were videotaped while describing teachers. Each student described a teacher honestly to one peer, deceitfully to a second peer, and then had to describe the teacher to both peers while they were sitting side by side. They discovered that people frequently struggle to maintain their lies because they sound and appear deceptive. Moreover, people become disfluent and equivocate when speaking in front of multiple audiences. The study suggested that paralinguistic cognitive complexity cues, among the factors examined, provide the most comprehensive explanation for why people seem dishonest in the multiple-audience situation.

A study by Ann E. Schlosser concluded that "posters" (those who share their experiences with others) are only influenced by a negative opinion from another person because it raises social concerns like emerging as indiscriminate. They consequently lower their public attitudes. This negativity bias appears to be caused by self-presentational concerns because ‘lurkers’ (those who did not post their opinion) were less affected by another's negative opinion. Furthermore, when explaining their attitudes in public, posters offered more than one perspective. Despite the positive product experiences and adherence to these attitudes on the part of the posters, these effects persisted.

Furthermore, a research paper by Elizabeth G. Pontikes highlights the influence of different audiences on organisational behaviour.

== Criticism ==
Sometimes, people try to appear as different identities to different people when crafting a message, or reveal some information to one person while hiding it from another. Although this theory has been helpful in understanding communication challenges in a variety of contexts, it has its shortcomings. For instance, Oversimplification: According to the multiple audience dilemma theory, people can be neatly divided into different groups, each of which has its own set of conflicting expectations. However, this oversimplifies the nuanced nature of human social dynamics and fails to take into account the possibility that people may hold a variety of identities and convictions that are not necessarily in opposition to one another.

Indeed, one study conducted in 2000 provides information to support the idea that the multiple audience dilemma is flawed. Results showed that in experiment 1, participants who adopted different personas in initial interactions with two other participants (playing the part of a studious nerd with one and a fun-loving party animal with the other) were able to actually maintain these personas when they interacted with both people at the same time later, suggesting that indeed, to some extent, the multiple audience dilemma may be inaccurate.

Moreover, a study highlights that the challenges of having multiple audiences have been discussed in previous accounts of social performance, but few go into detail about the circumstances in which a performer's audiences are not only multiple but also interconnected in such a way that one audience's response will affect another.
