= Impression management =

Process to attempt to influence perceptions

Impression management is a conscious or subconscious process in which people attempt to influence the perceptions of other people about a person, object or event by regulating and controlling information in social interaction. It was first conceptualized by Erving Goffman in 1956 in The Presentation of Self in Everyday Life, and then was expanded upon in 1967.

Impression management behaviors include accounts (providing "explanations for a negative event to escape disapproval"), excuses (denying "responsibility for negative outcomes"), and opinion conformity ("speak(ing) or behav(ing) in ways consistent with the target"), along with many others. By utilizing such behaviors, those who partake in impression management are able to control others' perception of them or events pertaining to them. Impression management is possible in nearly any situation, such as in sports (wearing flashy clothes or trying to impress fans with their skills), or on social media (only sharing positive posts). Impression management can be used with either benevolent or malicious intent.

Impression management is usually used synonymously with self-presentation, in which a person tries to influence the perception of their image. The notion of impression management was first applied to face-to-face communication, but then was expanded to apply to computer-mediated communication. The concept of impression management is applicable to academic fields of study such as psychology and sociology as well as practical fields such as corporate communication and media.

== Background ==
The foundation and the defining principles of impression management were created by Erving Goffman in The Presentation of Self in Everyday Life. Impression management theory states that one tries to alter one's perception according to one's goals. In other words, the theory is about how individuals wish to present themselves, but in a way that satisfies their needs and goals. Goffman "proposed to focus on how people in daily work situations present themselves and, in so doing, what they are doing to others", and he was "particularly interested in how a person guides and controls how others form an impression of them and what a person may or may not do while performing before them".

== Theory ==
=== Motives ===
Impression management can be found in all social interactions, whether real or imaginary, and is governed by a range of factors. The characteristics of a given social situation are important; specifically, the surrounding cultural norms determine the appropriateness of particular nonverbal behaviors. The actions and exchange have to be appropriate to the targets, and within that culture's norms. Thus, the nature of the audience and its relationship with the speaker influences the way impression management is realized.

The awareness of being a potential subject of monitoring is also crucial. A person's goals inform the strategies of impression management, and can influence how they are received. This leads to distinct ways of presenting the self. Self-efficacy describes whether a person is convinced that it is possible to convey the intended impression. Conmen, for instance, can rely on their ability to emanate self-assuredness in the process of gaining a mark's trust.

There is evidence that people are more likely to pay attention to faces associated with negative gossip compared to those with neutral or positive associations. This contributes to a body of work indicating that human perceptions are shaped by unconscious brain processes that determine what they "choose" to see or ignore—even before a person is consciously aware of it. The findings add to the idea that the brain evolved to be particularly sensitive to "bad guys" or cheaters—fellow humans who undermine social life by deception, theft or other non-cooperative behavior.

There are many methods behind self-presentation, including self-disclosure (identifying what makes you "you" to another person), managing appearances (trying to fit in), ingratiation, aligning actions (making one's actions seem appealing or understandable), and alter-casting (imposing identities onto other people). Maintaining a version of self-presentation that is generally considered to be attractive can help to increase one's social capital; this method is commonly used at networking events. These self-presentation methods can also be used by corporations for impression management with the public.

=== Self-presentation ===
Self-presentation is conveying information about oneself – or an image of oneself – to others. There are two types and motivations of self-presentation:

- presentation meant to match one's own self-image, and
- presentation meant to match audience expectations and preferences.

Self-presentation is expressive. Individuals construct an image of themselves to claim personal identity, and present themselves in a manner that is consistent with that image. If they feel like it is restricted, they often exhibit reactance or become defiant – try to assert their freedom against those who would seek to curtail self-presentation expressiveness. An example of this dynamic is someone who grew up with extremely strict or controlling parental figures. The child in this situation may feel that their identity and emotions have been suppressed, which may cause them to behave negatively towards others.

- Boasting – Millon notes that in self-presentation individuals are challenged to balance boasting against discrediting themselves via excessive self-promotion or being caught and being proven wrong. Individuals often have limited ability to perceive how their efforts impact their acceptance and likeability by others.
- Flattery – flattery or praise to increase social attractiveness
- Intimidation – aggressively showing anger to get others to hear and obey one's demands.

Self-presentation can be either defensive or assertive strategies (also described as protective versus acquisitive). Whereas defensive strategies include behaviours like avoidance of threatening situations or means of self-handicapping, assertive strategies refer to more active behaviour like the verbal idealisation of the self, the use of status symbols or similar practices.

These strategies play important roles in one's maintenance of self-esteem. One's self-esteem is affected by their evaluation of their own performance and their perception of how others react to their performance. As a result, people actively portray impressions that will elicit self-esteem enhancing reactions from others.

In 2019, as filtered photos are perceived as deceptive by users, PlentyOfFish along with other dating sites have started to ban filtered images.

=== Social interaction ===
Goffman argued in his 1967 book, Interaction ritual, that people participate in social interactions by performing a "line", or "pattern of verbal and nonverbal acts", which is created and maintained by both the performer and the audience. By enacting a line effectively, the person gains positive social value, which is also called "face". The success of a social interaction will depend on whether the performer has the ability to maintain face. As a result, a person is required to display a kind of character by becoming "someone who can be relied upon to maintain himself as an interactant, poised for communication, and to act so that others do not endanger themselves by presenting themselves as interactants to him". Goffman analyses how a human being in "ordinary work situations presents himself and his activity to others, the ways in which he guides and controls the impression they form of him, and the kinds of things he may and may not do while sustaining his performance before them".

When Goffman turned to focus on people physically presented in a social interaction, the "social dimension of impression management certainly extends beyond the specific place and time of engagement in the organization". Impression management is "a social activity that has individual and community implications". We call it "pride" when a person displays a good showing from duty to himself, while we call it "honor" when he "does so because of duty to wider social units, and receives support from these duties in doing so".

Another approach to moral standards that Goffman pursues is the notion of "rules of conduct", which "can be partially understood as obligations or moral constraints". These rules may be substantive (involving laws, morality, and ethics) or ceremonial (involving etiquette). Rules of conduct play an important role when a relationship "is asymmetrical and the expectations of one person toward another are hierarchical."

=== Dramaturgical analogy ===
Goffman presented impression management dramaturgically, explaining the motivations behind complex human performances within a social setting based on a play metaphor. Goffman's work incorporates aspects of a symbolic interactionist perspective, emphasizing a qualitative analysis of the interactive nature of the communication process. Impression management requires the physical presence of others. Performers who seek certain ends in their interest, must "work to adapt their behavior in such a way as to give off the correct impression to a particular audience" and "implicitly ask that the audience take their performance seriously". Goffman proposed that while among other people individual would always strive to control the impression that others form of him or her so that to achieve individual or social goals.

The actor, shaped by the environment and target audience, sees interaction as a performance. The objective of the performance is to provide the audience with an impression consistent with the desired goals of the actor. Thus, impression management is also highly dependent on the situation. In addition to these goals, individuals differ in responses from the interactive environment, some may be non-responsive to an audience's reactions while others actively respond to audience reactions in order to elicit positive results. These differences in response towards the environment and target audience are called self-monitoring. Another factor in impression management is self-verification, the act of conforming the audience to the person's self-concept.

The audience can be real or imaginary. IM style norms, part of the mental programming received through socialization, are so fundamental that we usually do not notice our expectations of them. While an actor (speaker) tries to project a desired image, an audience (listener) might attribute a resonant or discordant image. An example is provided by situations in which embarrassment occurs and threatens the image of a participant.

Goffman proposes that performers "can use dramaturgical discipline as a defense to ensure that the 'show' goes on without interruption." Goffman contends that dramaturgical discipline includes:

1. coping with dramaturgical contingencies;
2. demonstrating intellectual and emotional involvement;
3. remembering one's part and not committing unmeant gestures or faux pas;
4. not giving away secrets involuntarily;
5. covering up inappropriate behavior on the part of teammates on the spur of the moment;
6. offering plausible reasons or deep apologies for disruptive events;
7. maintaining self-control (for example, speaking briefly and modestly);
8. suppressing emotions to private problems; and
9. suppressing spontaneous feelings.

== Application ==
=== Face-to-face communication ===
==== Self, social identity and social interaction ====
The social psychologist, Edward E. Jones, brought the study of impression management to the field of psychology during the 1960s and extended it to include people's attempts to control others' impression of their personal characteristics. His work sparked an increased attention towards impression management as a fundamental interpersonal process.

The concept of self is important to the theory of impression management as the images people have of themselves shape and are shaped by social interactions. Our self-concept develops from social experience early in life. Schlenker (1980) further suggests that children anticipate the effect that their behaviours will have on others and how others will evaluate them. They control the impressions they might form on others, and in doing so they control the outcomes they obtain from social interactions.

Social identity refers to how people are defined and regarded in social interactions. Individuals use impression management strategies to influence the social identity they project to others. The identity that people establish influences their behaviour in front of others, others' treatment of them and the outcomes they receive. Therefore, in their attempts to influence the impressions others form of themselves, a person plays an important role in affecting his social outcomes.

Social interaction is the process by which we act and react to those around us. In a nutshell, social interaction includes those acts people perform toward each other and the responses they give in return. The most basic function of self-presentation is to define the nature of a social situation (Goffman, 1959). Most social interactions are very role governed. Each person has a role to play, and the interaction proceeds smoothly when these roles are enacted effectively. People also strive to create impressions of themselves in the minds of others in order to gain material and social rewards (or avoid material and social punishments).

==== Cross-cultural communication ====
Understanding how one's impression management behavior might be interpreted by others can also serve as the basis for smoother interactions and as a means for solving some of the most insidious communication problems among individuals of different racial/ethnic and gender backgrounds (Sanaria, 2016).

"People are sensitive to how they are seen by others and use many forms of impression management to compel others to react to them in the ways they wish" (Giddens, 2005, p. 142). An example of this concept is easily illustrated through cultural differences. Different cultures have diverse thoughts and opinions on what is considered beautiful or attractive. For example, Americans tend to find tan skin attractive, but in Indonesian culture, pale skin is more desirable. It is also argued that Women in India use different impression management strategies as compared to women in western cultures (Sanaria, 2016).

Another illustration of how people attempt to control how others perceive them is portrayed through the clothing they wear. A person who is in a leadership position strives to be respected and in order to control and maintain the impression. This illustration can also be adapted for a cultural scenario. The clothing people choose to wear says a great deal about the person and the culture they represent. For example, most Americans are not overly concerned with conservative clothing. Most Americans are content with tee shirts, shorts, and showing skin. The exact opposite is true on the other side of the world. "Indonesians are both modest and conservative in their attire" (Cole, 1997, p. 77).

One way people shape their identity is through sharing photos on social media platforms. The ability to modify photos by certain technologies, such as Photoshop, helps achieve their idealized images.

Companies use cross-cultural training (CCT) to facilitate effective cross-cultural interaction. CCT can be defined as any procedure used to increase an individual's ability to cope with and work in a foreign environment. Training employees in culturally consistent and specific impression management (IM) techniques provide the avenue for the employee to consciously switch from an automatic, home culture IM mode to an IM mode that is culturally appropriate and acceptable. Second, training in IM reduces the uncertainty of interaction with FNs and increases employee's ability to cope by reducing unexpected events.

==== Team-working in hospital wards ====
Impression management theory can also be used in health communication. It can be used to explore how professionals 'present' themselves when interacting on hospital wards and also how they employ front stage and backstage settings in their collaborative work.

In the hospital wards, Goffman's front stage and backstage performances are divided into 'planned' and 'ad hoc' rather than 'official' and 'unofficial' interactions.

- Planned front stage is the structured collaborative activities such as ward rounds and care conferences which took place in the presence of patients and/or carers.
- Ad hoc front stage is the unstructured or unplanned interprofessional interactions that took place in front of patients/carers or directly involved patients/carers.
- Planned backstage is the structured multidisciplinary team meeting (MDT) in which professionals gathered in a private area of the ward, in the absence of patients, to discuss management plans for patients under their care.
- Ad hoc backstage is the use of corridors and other ward spaces for quick conversations between professionals in the absence of patients/carers.
- Offstage is the social activities between and among professional groups/individuals outside of the hospital context.

Results show that interprofessional interactions in this setting are often based less on planned front stage activities than on ad hoc backstage activities. While the former may, at times, help create and maintain an appearance of collaborative interprofessional 'teamwork', conveying a sense of professional togetherness in front of patients and their families, they often serve little functional practice. These findings have implications for designing ways to improve interprofessional practice on acute hospital wards where there is no clearly defined interprofessional team, but rather a loose configuration of professionals working together in a collaborative manner around a particular patient. In such settings, interventions that aim to improve both ad hoc as well as planned forms of communication may be more successful than those intended to only improve planned communication.

=== Computer-mediated communication ===
The hyperpersonal model of computer-mediated communication (CMC) posits that users exploit the technological aspects of CMC in order to enhance the messages they construct to manage impressions and facilitate desired relationships. The most interesting aspect of the advent of CMC is how it reveals basic elements of interpersonal communication, bringing into focus fundamental processes that occur as people meet and develop relationships relying on typed messages as the primary mechanism of expression. "Physical features such as one's appearance and voice provide much of the information on which people base first impressions face-to-face, but such features are often unavailable in CMC. Various perspectives on CMC have suggested that the lack of nonverbal cues diminishes CMC's ability to foster impression formation and management, or argued impressions develop nevertheless, relying on language and content cues. One approach that describes the way that CMC's technical capacities work in concert with users' impression development intentions is the hyperpersonal model of CMC (Walther, 1996). As receivers, CMC users idealize partners based on the circumstances or message elements that suggest minimal similarity or desirability. As senders, CMC users selectively self-present, revealing attitudes and aspects of the self in a controlled and socially desirable fashion. The CMC channel facilitates editing, discretion, and convenience, and the ability to tune out environmental distractions and re-allocate cognitive resources in order to further enhance one's message composition. Finally, CMC may create dynamic feedback loops wherein the exaggerated expectancies are confirmed and reciprocated through mutual interaction via the bias-prone communication processes identified above."

According to O'Sullivan's (2000) impression management model of communication channels, individuals will prefer to use mediated channels rather than face-to-face conversation in face-threatening situations. Within his model, this trend is due to the channel features that allow for control over exchanged social information. The present paper extends O'Sullivan's model by explicating information control as a media affordance, arising from channel features and social skills, that enables an individual to regulate and restrict the flow of social information in an interaction, and present a scale to measure it. One dimension of the information control scale, expressive information control, positively predicted channel preference for recalled face-threatening situations. This effect remained after controlling for social anxiousness and power relations in relationships. O'Sullivan's model argues that some communication channels may help individuals manage this struggle and therefore be more preferred as those situations arise. It was based on an assumption that channels with features that allow fewer social cues, such as reduced nonverbal information or slower exchange of messages, invariably afford an individual with an ability to better manage the flow of a complex, ambiguous, or potentially difficult conversations. Individuals manage what information about them is known, or isn't known, to control other's impression of them. Anyone who has given the bathroom a quick cleaning when they anticipate the arrival of their mother-in-law (or date) has managed their impression. For an example from information and communication technology use, inviting someone to view a person's Webpage before a face-to-face meeting may predispose them to view the person a certain way when they actually meet.

==== Corporate brand ====
The impression management perspective offers potential insight into how corporate stories could build the corporate brand, by influencing the impressions that stakeholders form of the organization. The link between themes and elements of corporate stories and IM strategies/behaviours indicates that these elements will influence audiences' perceptions of the corporate brand.

===== Corporate storytelling =====
Corporate storytelling is suggested to help demonstrate the importance of the corporate brand to internal and external stakeholders, and create a position for the company against competitors, as well as help a firm to bond with its employees (Roper and Fill, 2012). The corporate reputation is defined as a stakeholder's perception of the organization (Brown et al., 2006), and Dowling (2006) suggests that if the story causes stakeholders to perceive the organization as more authentic, distinctive, expert, sincere, powerful, and likeable, then it is likely that this will enhance the overall corporate reputation.

Impression management theory is a relevant perspective to explore the use of corporate stories in building the corporate brand. The corporate branding literature notes that interactions with brand communications enable stakeholders to form an impression of the organization (Abratt and Keyn, 2012), and this indicates that IM theory could also therefore bring insight into the use of corporate stories as a form of communication to build the corporate brand. Exploring the IM strategies/behaviors evident in corporate stories can indicate the potential for corporate stories to influence the impressions that audiences form of the corporate brand.

===== Corporate document =====
Firms use more subtle forms of influencing outsiders' impressions of firm performance and prospects, namely by manipulating the content and presentation of information in corporate documents with the purpose of "distort[ing] readers" perceptions of corporate achievements" [Godfrey et al., 2003, p. 96]. In the accounting literature this is referred to as impression management. The opportunity for impression management in corporate reports is increasing. Narrative disclosures have become longer and more sophisticated over the last few years. This growing importance of descriptive sections in corporate documents provides firms with the opportunity to overcome information asymmetries by presenting more detailed information and explanation, thereby increasing their decision-usefulness. However, they also offer an opportunity for presenting financial performance and prospects in the best possible light, thus having the opposite effect. In addition to the increased opportunity for opportunistic discretionary disclosure choices, impression management is also facilitated in that corporate narratives are largely unregulated.

==== Media ====
The medium of communication influences the actions taken in impression management. Self-efficacy can differ according to the fact whether the trial to convince somebody is made through face-to-face-interaction or by means of an e-mail. Communication via devices like telephone, e-mail or chat is governed by technical restrictions, so that the way people express personal features etc. can be changed. This often shows how far people will go.

The affordances of a certain medium also influence the way a user self-presents. Communication via a professional medium such as e-mail would result in professional self-presentation. The individual would use greetings, correct spelling, grammar and capitalization as well as scholastic language. Personal communication mediums such as text-messaging would result in a casual self-presentation where the user shortens words, includes emojis and selfies and uses less academic language.

Another example of impression management theory in play is present in today's world of social media. Users are able to create a profile and share whatever they like with their friends, family, or the world. Users can choose to omit negative life events and highlight positive events if they so please.

===== Profiles on social networking sites =====
Social media usage among American adults grew from 5% in 2005 to 69% in 2018. Facebook is the most popular social media platform, followed by Instagram, TikTok, and WhatsApp.

Social networking users will employ protective self-presentations for image management. Users will use subtractive and repudiate strategies to maintain a desired image. Subtractive strategy is used to untag an undesirable photo on Social Networking Sites. In addition to un-tagging their name, some users will request the photo to be removed entirely. Repudiate strategy is used when a friend posts an undesirable comment about the user. In response to an undesired post, users may add another wall post as an innocence defense. Michael Stefanone states that "self-esteem maintenance is an important motivation for strategic self-presentation online." Outside evaluations of their physical appearance, competence, and approval from others determines how social media users respond to pictures and wall posts. Unsuccessful self-presentation online can lead to rejection and criticism from social groups. Social media users are motivated to actively participate in SNS from a desire to manage their online image.

Online social media presence often varies with respect to users' age, gender, and body weight. While men and women tend to use social media in comparable degrees, both uses and capabilities vary depending on individual preferences as well perceptions of power or dominance. In terms of performance, men tend to display characteristics associated with masculinity as well as more commanding language styles. In much the same way, women tend to present feminine self-depictions and engage in more supportive language.

With respect to usage across age variances, many children develop digital and social media literacy skills around 7 or 8 and begin to form online social relationships via virtual environments designed for their age group. The years between thirteen and fifteen demonstrate high social media usage that begins to become more balanced with offline interactions as teens learn to navigate both their online and in-person identities which may often diverge from one another.

Social media platforms often provide a great degree of social capital during the college years and later. College students are motivated to use Facebook for impression management, self-expression, entertainment, communication and relationship maintenance. College students sometimes rely on Facebook to build a favorable online identity, which contributes to greater satisfaction with campus life. In building an online persona, college students sometimes engage in identity manipulation, including altering personality and appearance, to increase their self-esteem and appear more attractive to peers. Since risky behavior is frequently deemed attractive by peers, college students often use their social media profiles to gain approval by highlighting instances of risky behavior, like alcohol use and unhealthy eating. Users present risky behavior as signs of achievement, fun, and sociability, participating in a form of impression management aimed at building recognition and acceptance among peers. During middle adulthood, users tend to display greater levels of confidence and mastery in their social media connections while older adults tend to use social media for educational and supportive purposes. These myriad factors influence how users will form and communicate their online personas. In addition to that, TikTok has made an influence on college students and adults to create their own self-image on a social media platform. The positivity of this is that college students and adults are using this to create their own brand for business purposes and for entertainment purposes. This gives them a chance to seek the desires of stardom and build an audience for revenue. Media fatigue is a negative effect that is caused by the conveyance of social media presence. Social anxiety stems from low-self esteem which causes a strain of stress in one's self-identity that is perceived in the media limelight for targeted audiences.

According to Marwick, social profiles create implications such as "context collapse" for presenting oneself to the audience. The concept of 'context collapse' suggests that social technologies make it difficult to vary self-presentation based on environment or audience. "Large sites such as Facebook and Twitter group friends, family members, coworkers, and acquaintances together under the umbrella term 'friends'."

==== Political impression management ====
Impression management is also influential in the political spectrum. "Political impression management" was coined in 1972 by sociologist Peter M. Hall, who defined the term as the art of marking a candidate look electable and capable (Hall, 1972). This is due in part to the importance of "presidential" candidates—appearance, image, and narrative are a key part of a campaign and thus impression management has always been a huge part of winning an election (Katz 2016). Social media has evolved to be part of the political process, thus political impression management is becoming more challenging as the online image of the candidate often now lies in the hands of the voters themselves.

The evolution of social media has increased the way in which political campaigns are targeting voters and how influential impression management is when discussing political issues and campaigns. Political campaigns continue to use social media as a way to promote their campaigns and share information about who they are to make sure to lead the conversation about their political platform. Research has shown that political campaigns must create clear profiles for each candidate in order to convey the right message to potential voters.

=== In the workplace ===
In professional settings, impression management is usually primarily focused on appearing competent, but also involves constructing and displaying an image of oneself that others find socially desirable and believably authentic. People manage impressions by their choice of dress, dressing either more or less formally, and this impacts perceptions their coworkers and supervisors form. The process includes a give and take; the person managing their impression receives feedback as the people around them interact with the self they are presenting and respond, either favorably or negatively. Research has shown impression management to be impactful in the workplace because the perceptions co-workers form of one another shape their relationships and indirectly influence their ability to function well as teams and achieve goals together.

In their research on impression management among leaders, Peck and Hogue define "impression management as conscious or unconscious, authentic or inauthentic, goal-directed behavior individuals engage in to influence the impression others form of them in social interactions." Using those three dimensions, labelled "automatic" vs. "controlled", "authentic" vs. "inauthentic", and "pro-self" vs. "pro-social", Peck and Hogue formed a typology of eight impression management archetypes. They suggest that while no one archetype stands out as the sole correct or ideal way to practice impression management as a leader, types rooted in authenticity and pro-social goals, rather than self-focused goals, create the most positive perceptions among followers.

Impression management strategies employed in the workplace also involve deception, and the ability to recognize deceptive acts impacts the supervisor-subordinate relationship as well as coworker relationships. When it comes to workplace behaviors, ingratiation is the major focus of impression management research. Ingratiation behaviors are those that employees engage in to elicit a favorable impression from a supervisor. These behaviors can have a negative or positive impact on coworkers and supervisors, and this impact is dependent on how ingratiating is perceived by the target and those who observe the ingratiating behaviors. The perception that follows an ingratiation act is dependent on whether the target attributes the behavior to the authentic-self of the person performing the act, or to impression management strategies. Once the target is aware that ingratiation is resulting from impression management strategies, the target will perceive ethical concerns regarding the performance. However, if the target attributes the ingratiation performance to the actor's authentic-self, the target will perceive the behavior as positive and not have ethical concerns.

Workplace leaders that are publicly visible, such as CEOs, also perform impression management with regard to stakeholders outside their organizations. In a study comparing online profiles of North American and European CEOs, research showed that while education was referenced similarly in both groups, profiles of European CEOs tended to be more professionally focused, while North American CEO profiles often referenced the CEO's public life outside business dealings, including social and political stances and involvement.

Employees also engage in impression management behaviors to conceal or reveal personal stigmas. How these individuals approach their disclosure of the stigma(s) impacts coworker's perceptions of the individual, as well as the individual's perception of themselves, and thus affects likeability amongst coworkers and supervisors.

==== Gender differences ====
Gender differences from gender roles also emerge in professional impression management (IM). Across organizational research, women are typically described as engaging in IM strategies that emphasize warmth, cooperation, and relational behaviour (ie. opinion conformity, supplication), which are consistent with their communal gender norms. Men, in contrast, tend to use more agentic IM tactics that highlight assertiveness or dominance (ie. self-promotion, intimidation), which align with their traditionally masculine expectations.

These gender differences not only shape how impression management is performed but also how it is evaluated. Behaviours associated with assertiveness or self-promotion are often rewarded in many professional contexts. In contrast, IM tactics that align with feminine norms may be more undervalued.

The research also notes that women are disadvantaged in both situations, where adhering to communal norms can be interpreted as a lack of agency, while adopting assertive behaviours can lead to negative consequences rather than rewards.

== Implications ==
Impression management can distort the results of empirical research that relies on interviews and surveys, a phenomenon commonly referred to as "social desirability bias". Impression management theory nevertheless constitutes a field of research on its own. When it comes to practical questions concerning public relations and the way organizations should handle their public image, the assumptions provided by impression management theory can also provide a framework.

An examination of different impression management strategies acted out by individuals who were facing criminal trials where the trial outcomes could range from a death sentence, life in prison or acquittal has been reported in the forensic literature. The Perri and Lichtenwald article examined female psychopathic killers, whom as a group were highly motivated to manage the impression that attorneys, judges, mental health professions and ultimately, a jury had of the murderers and the murder they committed. It provides legal case illustrations of the murderers combining and/or switching from one impression management strategy such as ingratiation or supplication to another as they worked towards their goal of diminishing or eliminating any accountability for the murders they committed.

Since the 1990s, researchers in the area of sport and exercise psychology have studied self-presentation. Concern about how one is perceived has been found to be relevant to the study of athletic performance. For example, anxiety may be produced when an athlete is in the presence of spectators. Self-presentational concerns have also been found to be relevant to exercise. For example, the concerns may elicit motivation to exercise.

More recent research investigating the effects of impression management on social behaviour showed that social behaviours (e.g. eating) can serve to convey a desired impression to others and enhance one's self-image. Research on eating has shown that people tend to eat less when they believe that they are being observed by others.

See also Manipulation (psychology)

== See also ==
- Calculating Visions: Kennedy, Johnson, and Civil Rights (book)
- Dignity
- Dramaturgy (sociology)
- First impression (psychology)
- Ingratiation
- Instagram's impact on people
- Online identity management
- On the Internet, nobody knows you're a dog
- Personal branding
- Register (sociolinguistics)
- Reputation capital
- Reputation management
- Self-monitoring theory
- Self-verification theory
- Signalling (economics)
- Spin (public relations)
- Superficial charm
- Stigma management
