= Compliance gaining =

Intentionally altering the behavior of others

Compliance gaining is a term used in the social sciences that encompasses the intentional act of altering another's behavior. Research in this area originated in the field of social psychology, but communication scholars have also provided ample research in compliance gaining. While persuasion focuses on attitudes and beliefs, compliance gaining focuses on behavior.

== Overview ==
Compliance gaining occurs whenever a person intentionally induces another person to do something that they might have not done otherwise. Compliance gaining and persuasion are related; however, they are not one and the same. Changes in attitudes and beliefs are often the goal in persuasion; compliance gaining seeks to change the behavior of a target. It is not necessary to change a person's attitude or beliefs to gain compliance. For instance, an automobile driver might have positive attitudes towards driving fast. The threat of a speeding ticket from a police officer positioned in a speed trap may gain compliance from the driver. Conversely, persuading someone to change their attitude or belief will not necessarily gain compliance. A doctor might tell a patient that tobacco use poses a serious threat to a smoker's health. The patient may accept this as a fact and view smoking negatively, but might also continue to use tobacco.

== Developments ==
Compliance gaining research has its roots in social psychology, but overlaps with many other disciplines such as communication and sociology. Compliance gaining can occur via mediated channels, but the research is most associated with interpersonal communication. In 1967, sociologists Marwell and Schmitt attempted to explain how people select compliance gaining messages. The researchers posited that people have a mental bank of strategies that they draw from when selecting a message. Marwell and Schmitt created a typology for compliance gaining techniques: promise, threat, positive expertise, negative expertise, liking, pregiving, aversive stimulation, debt, moral appeal, positive self-feeling, negative self-feeling, positive altercasting, negative altertcasting, altruism, positive esteem, and negative esteem. This study was the catalyst for more interest in compliance gaining from communication scholars.

Miller, Boster, Roloff, and Seibold (1977) as well as Cody and McLaughlin (1980) studied the situational variables that influences compliance gaining strategies. The latter study identified six different typologies of situations that can influence compliance gaining behaviors: personal benefits (how much personal gain an actor can yield from the influencing behavior), dominance (the power relation between the actor and the target), rights (whether the actor has the right to expect compliance), resistance (how easy will the target be influenced), intimacy (whether the relation between actor and target is shallow), and consequences (what sort of effect this situation would have on the relationship between actor and target). Dillard and Burgoon (1985) later investigated the Cody-McLaughlin typologies. They concluded that situational variables, as described by Cody and McLaughlin, did very little to predict compliance gaining strategy selection. As early as 1982, there was already strong criticism about the strength of the relationships between situational variables and compliance gaining message selection.

By the 1990s, many research efforts attempting to link compliance gaining strategy selection and features of a situation or features of the individual "failed to coalesce into a coherent body of knowledge". Situational dimensions and individual differences were not effective in predicting so researchers went into other perspectives in an effort to understand compliance gaining. For instance, Schrader and Dillard (1998) linked primary and secondary goals to compliance gaining strategy. Using the theoretical framework of Goals-Plans-Actions developed by Dillard in 1980, Schrader and Dillard operate from the assumption that individuals possess and act on multiple goals. In any compliance seeking situation, the actor has primary goals that drive the attempt to influence a target. The primary goal is what the interaction is all about. For instance, if an actor wants a target to stop smoking, this is the primary goal and this is what drives the interaction. However, in the course of pursuing that goal, there are "secondary" goals to consider. These are goals that limit the behavior of the actor. If getting a target to stop smoking is the primary goal, then a secondary goal might be to maintain a friendly relationship with the target. Dillard specifies five types of secondary goals that temper the compliance gaining behavior: identity goals (morals and personal standards), interaction goals (impression management), relational resource goals (relationship management), personal resource goals (material concerns of the actor), and arousal management goals (efforts to manage anxiety about the compliance gaining attempt).

Despite the charges of individual differences making very little progress in prediction compliance gaining strategies, some researchers in the 2000s have focused their efforts to rectify this weakness in the research to link individual differences with compliance gaining effectiveness. King (2001), acknowledging the paucity of robust situational and trait studies linked to compliance gaining, attempted to isolate one situation as a predictor for compliance gaining message selection. King's research suggested that when target of compliance gaining were perceived to be less resistant to influence attempts, the actors used more compliance gaining tactics. When targets were perceived as strongly resistant, the actors used less tactics. Elias and Loomis (2004) found that gender and race affect an instructor's ability to gain compliance in a college classroom. Punyanunt (2000) found that using humor may enhance the effectiveness of pro-social compliance gaining techniques in the classroom. Remland and Jones (1994) found that vocal intensity and touch also affect compliance gaining. Goei et al. (2003) posited that "feelings of liking" between target and actor as well as doing favors for the target lead to liking and obligation, which leads to increased compliance. Pre-giving (giving a target a small gift or favor such as a free sample of food) is positively associated with increased compliance in strangers. One of the major criticisms of examining compliance gaining literature is that very little research studies actual compliance. Filling out a survey and reporting intent to comply with a request is certainly different than actually completing the request. For example, many people might report that they will comply with a doctor's order, but away from the doctor's office, they may ignore medical advice.

== Application ==
Compliance-gaining research has a diverse background, and much of the research draws on alternative paradigms and perspectives. As mentioned above, the field of compliance gaining originated in social psychology but was later adopted by scholars in communication studies. Researchers across various fields, ranging from consumer psychology to primary education pedagogy, have also taken a keen interest in compliance gaining.

=== Public administration and public policy ===
Public administration scholars study compliance to understand why public policy targets, such as citizens, act in a fashion that achieves preferred outcomes. For instance, they focus on a wide range of areas from stay-at-home orders during the COVID-19 pandemic and tax collection to reducing obesity through healthy eating and discouraging speeding on highways. Two dominant theories have been used to explain why people do or do not comply with policy prescriptions: the rational actor perspective of classical economics and behavioral economics. The rational actor perspective sees policy targets as reasonable, non-emotional individuals, often labeled as Econs or Homo Economicus, and it will utilize self-interest and incentives in shaping their decision making. For instance, a rational actor view of obesity explains compliance by people rationally responding to the higher prices of unhealthy food or choosing what’s best for them when nutritional facts are added to food labels. The behavioral economic lens sees policy targets as sometimes irrational actors whose choices are influenced by emotions and impulses, that is, as real humans, and will suggest compliance mechanisms, such as emphasizing social norms, nudging people to make the right choice through choice architecture, or making the default option the desired outcome and thus making compliance easy. Applying behavioral insights to obesity highlights how unhealthy eating habits like overeating are induced by cues in the environment, such as large portion sizes.

=== Medicine ===
Doctors have expressed much frustration with compliance resistance from their patients. A reported 50% of patients do not comply with medical advice and prescriptions. Researchers, as well as medical professionals, have a vested interest in learning strategies that can increase compliance in their patients. Many severe and chronic conditions can be avoided if early treatments are followed as prescribed, avoiding death, permanent injury, and costlier medical treatments later on. Researchers in communication have reported some key findings such as: clear and effective communication about a patient's condition or illness increases the likelihood of patient compliance with medical advice; doctors that use humor in their communication with patients have higher satisfaction rates; high satisfaction rates with physicians is highly correlated with patient compliance.

=== Pedagogy ===
For teachers, gaining compliance from students is a must for effective teaching. Studies in compliance gaining have ranged from elementary education all the way to adult and higher education.

=== Sales and consumer psychology ===
Advertising and marketing are tools of persuasion. There is literally centuries' worth of literature available about persuasion. However, changing attitudes and beliefs about a product does not necessarily change behaviors. Purchasing a product is a behavior. Researchers such as Parrish-Sprowl, Carveth, & Senk (1994) have applied compliance gaining research to effective sales.

== Compliance ==
Compliance gaining was not originally conceived in the field of communication but found its roots in the late 1960s as a result of studies and research by two sociologists, Gerald Marwell and David Schmitt. In 1967, Marwell and Schmitt produced some interesting compliance-gaining tactics concerning the act of getting a teenager to study. The tactics, sixteen in all, are as follows.

1. Promise: If you comply, I will reward you. For example, you offer to increase Dick's allowance if he studies more.
2. Threat: If you do not comply, I will punish you. For example, you threaten to forbid Dick to use the car if he doesn't start studying more.
3. Expertise (positive): If you comply, you will be rewarded because of the "nature of things." For example, you tell Dick that if he gets good grades he be able to get into college and get a good job.
4. Expertise (negative): If you do not comply, you will be punished because of the "nature of things." For example, you tell Dick that if he does not get good grades he will not be able to get into college or get a good job.
5. Liking: Act friendly and helpful to get the person in a "good frame of mind" so they comply with the request. For example, you try to be as friendly and pleasant as possible to put Dick in a good mood before asking him to study.
6. Pre-giving: Reward the person before requesting compliance. For example, raise Dick's allowance and tell him you now expect him to study.
7. Aversive stimulation: Continuously punish the person, making cessation contingent on compliance. For example, you tell Dick he may not use the car until he studies more.
8. Debt: You owe me compliance because of past favors. For example, you point out that you have sacrificed and saved to pay for Dick's education and that he owes it to you to get good enough grades to get into a good college.
9. Moral appeal: You are immoral if you do not comply. You tell Dick that it is morally wrong for anyone not to get as good grades as possible and that he should study more.
10. Self-feeling (positive): You will feel better about yourself if you comply. For example, you tell Dick that he will feel proud if he gets himself to study more.
11. Self-feeling (negative): You will feel worse about yourself if you do not comply. For example, you tell Dick that he will feel ashamed of himself if he gets bad grades.
12. Altercasting (positive): A person with "good" qualities would comply. For example, you tell Dick that because he is a mature and intelligent person he naturally will want to study more and get good grades.
13. Altercasting (negative): Only a person with "bad" qualities would not comply. For example, you tell Dick that he should study because only someone very childish does not study.
14. Altruism: I need your compliance very badly, so do it for me. For example, you tell Dick that you really want very badly for him to get into a good college and that you wish he would study more as a personal favor to you.
15. Esteem (positive): People you value will think better of you if you comply. For example, you tell Dick that the whole family will be very proud of him if he gets good grades.
16. Esteem (negative): People you value will think the worse of you if you do not comply. For example, you tell Dick that the whole family will be very disappointed in him if he gets poor grades.

In 1967, Marwell and Schmitt conducted experimental research, using the sixteen compliance gaining tactics and identified five basic compliance-gaining strategies: Rewarding activity, Punishing activity, Expertise, Activation of impersonal commitments, and Activation of personal commitments.

=== Power ===
Another element of compliance-gaining was produced in the early 1960s, as French and Raven were researching the concepts of power, legitimacy, and politeness. They identified five influential aspects associated with power, which help illustrate elements of the study of compliance. The fives bases of power are as follows:

1. Reward Power: A person with reward power has control over some valued resource (e.g., promotions and raises).
2. Coercive Power: A person with coercive power has the ability to inflict punishments (e.g., fire you).
3. Expert Power: Expert power is based on what a person knows (e.g., you may do what a doctor tells you to do because they know more about medicine than you do).
4. Legitimate Power: Legitimate power is based on formal rank or position (e.g., you obey someone's commands because they are the vice president in the company for which you work).
5. Referent Power: People have referent power when the person they are trying to influence wants to be like them (e.g., a mentor often has this type of power).

(French & Raven, 1960)

== Techniques ==
The study of compliance gaining has contributed significantly to the development of many commonly used and widely recognized techniques. The following are some of the techniques that have evolved from research on compliance-gaining strategies. Many of these techniques have been empirically documented to increase compliance.

=== Foot-in-the-door (FITD) ===
With research starting in 1966 by Freedman & Fraser, foot-in-the door is one of the earliest and most researched compliance gaining techniques. This technique gains compliance by making a smaller easy request then a larger more difficult request at a later time. The smaller request is usually one that would be widely accepted without scrutiny. The larger request is usually the actual the task or goal wanted to be completed.

==== Effectivity ====
Freedman and Fraser thought that after satisfying the smaller initial request, if the person was not forced to do then they must be "the type of person who fulfills such requests".

The smaller task/request should relate to the larger request and not be trivial. For the foot-in-the-door technique to be successful it must generate the self-aware "I am the kind of person who fulfills this type of request" other wise known as the self-perception theory. Other studies found that if the initial request is easy but unusual or bizarre, it would also generate the foot-in-the-door effectiveness. This idea was developed further into the Disrupt-Then-Reframe technique.

There are other reasons, besides self-perception theory, that contribute to the effectiveness of the foot-in-the-door technique.

Consistency – Cialdini and Guadagno, Asher, and Demaine believe that what makes people want to fulfill larger request is the need to be consistent.

The Norm to Help Others – Harris believed that after the first request, the norm to help others becomes clear. It only becomes evident after the person reviews his or her reason why they completed the original request.

Satisfying the First Request – Crano and Sivacek thought what made the technique so effective was personal satisfaction. "The person learns that the fulfillment of request brings the reward of a positive experience. One may assume that the likelihood that satisfaction of this type appears willi increase if the person has to react to something unusual that awakens his or her mindfulness, and will decrease in situations in which the person reacts automatically and habitually".

=== Door-in-the-face (DITF) ===
Door-in-the-face was first introduced in 1975 by Cialdini and colleagues. The opposite of foot-in-the-door, in the door-in-the-face technique, the requestor asks a large objectionable request which is denied by the target instead of gaining compliance by asking a smaller easy request. The requestor seeking compliance ask a smaller more reasonable request.

There are several theories that explain why door-in-the-face is an effective gaining compliance technique.

Self-presentation theory – "that individuals will comply with a second request due to fears one will be perceived negatively by rejecting successive prosocial request for compliance".

Reciprocal concessions – this theory describes the effects of door-in-the-face as a "process of mutual concessions". "The second request represents a concession on the part of the sender (from his or her initial request), and compliance to the second request represents a concession on the part of the receiver (from his or her inclination to not comply with the first request)".

Guilt – One reason that makes door-in-the-face such an effective technique is people feel guilty for refusing to comply with a request twice.

Social Responsibility – this theory describes the social repercussions and pressures that occur if an individual declines a request.

All together the theories propose that a target who declines the first request feel a "personal or social responsibility" to comply with the second request. In an effort to avoid feeling guilty or reduce the sense of obligation the target would have.

== Recent techniques ==
=== Disrupt-then-reframe (DTR) ===
DTR was first introduced by Barbara Price Davis and Eric S. Knowles in 1999. This technique states that a person will be more likely to comply with a request if the initial request or pitch is confusing. The pitch is immediately followed by a reframing or a reason to comply with the request.

An example of this technique is: A waiter states that "the steak dinner is on special for 800 pennies; it's a really good deal". Disrupting the couple by saying "800 pennies" instead of "8 dollars", the waiter is able to increase the likelihood that they will buy the steak dinner.

DTR was found to be a very effective way to gain compliance in non-profit instances such as raising money for charities or asking people to take a survey. DTR was found to be less successful as a sales technique; this may be because the message is more scrutinized, making it harder to confuse the target.

=== Persistence ===
Persistence used as a compliance gaining technique, gets the target to comply by repeating the message. In 1979, Cacioppo and Petty found that repeating the message more than five times lead to decrease in compliance. Success is enhanced if the repetition comes from more than one person and is enhanced further if the message has the same idea or meaning but is not exact.

An example of this technique would be: "My wife kept reminding me to take out the trash until I finally did it."

=== Dump and chase (DAC) ===
Persistence has a high probability of annoying the target and creating a negative interaction which could be viewed as "nagging". A way to avoid this would be rejecting the targets objection to your request by asking "why not?", then forming another message to overcome the second objection to gain compliance. This technique is called dump and chase.

Mechanics of this technique are urgency and guilt. When the repeated message is presented to the target it may be perceived as urgent, thus making it seem more important, and more willing to comply. By creating a sense of obligation in the request, the target may develop guilt if not willing to comply.

=== Just-One-More (JOM) ===
Just-One-More was developed as a way to make a donation seem more important. The use of this technique involves using the language of "Just-One-More" to gain compliance. The technique is found to be most useful in instances regarding volunteering and donations. It is seen as "the last person to help will be more rewarding than being one of the first or those in the middle, due to the expectation that the requestor will appreciate the last person more than any of those who complied previously". For Example: "Do you want to buy this car? I need just one more sale to reach my quota this month."

If the target finds that the requestor is lying or being deceptive about being the last one, it will create a negative outlook on the person and the organization that he or she represents. Even though losing some of the effectiveness the requestor could state that they are "close to their goal" or "almost there".

=== 64 compliance gaining strategies ===
In "Classifying Compliance Gaining Messages: Taxonomic Disorder and Strategic Confusion", Kathy Kellermann and Tim Cole put together 64 compliance gaining strategies as an attempt to classify more than 820 previous strategies.

1. Actor Takes Responsibility: Try to get others to comply by stating your willingness to help them or even work on the request yourself. That is, try to gain their compliance by offering to do it yourself as a means of getting them to do what you want. Example: "Is there anything I can do to so you can finish the project on time?"
2. Altercasting (Negative): Try to get others to comply by pointing out that only a bad person would not do what is wanted. That is, try to gain their compliance by noting that only a person with negative qualities wouldn't comply. Example: "You should stop watching these types of television shows as only a disturbed person would like them."
3. Altercasting (Positive): Try to get others to comply by pointing out that a good person would do what is wanted. That is, try to gain their compliance by noting that any person with positive qualities would comply. Example: "A good boy would eat all his vegetables."
4. Altruism: Try to get others to comply by asking them to give you a hand out of the goodness of their heart. That is, try to gain their compliance by asking them to be altruistic and just do it for you. Example: "Could you help me move, I would really appreciate it."
5. Assertion: Try to get others to comply by asserting (forcefully stating) what you want. That is, try to gain their compliance by demanding (commanding) them to comply. Example: "Go get a bandaid now!"
6. Audience-Use: Try to get others to comply by having a group of other people present when you make your request. That is, try to gain their compliance by asking them in front of other people as a way to back up your request. Example: "I asked her to go to the prom with me in front of her friends."
7. Authority Appeal: Try to get others to comply on the basis of the authority that you or other people have. That is, try to gain their compliance by using or relying on a position of power over them to get them do to what you want. Example: "My boss told me to get him the reports by 10 am so I did."
8. Aversive Stimulation: Try to get others to comply by doing things they do not like until they agree to comply. That is, try to gain their compliance by bothering them until they do what you want. Example: "My co-worker kept bothering me to quit smoking until I finally did."
9. Bargaining: Try to get others to comply by striking a bargain with them. That is, try to gain their compliance by negotiating a deal where you each do something for the other so everyone gets what they want. Example: "If you help me with the dishes, I will help you with the laundry."
10. Benefit (Other): Try to get others to comply by telling them people other than themselves would benefit if they do what you want. That is, try to gain their compliance by pointing out how it helps people other than themselves if they comply. Example: "By donating to our fundraiser, You ensure that everyone will have a coat this winter."
11. Benefit (Self): Try to get others to comply by telling them you personally would benefit if they do what you want. That is, try to gain their compliance by pointing out how it helps oneself if they comply. Example: "If you helped me with the yard work, then I won't get a ticket by the city tomorrow."
12. Benefit (Target): Try to get others to comply by telling them they personally would benefit if they do what you want. That is, try to gain their compliance by pointing out how it helps them if they comply. Example: "If you go grocery shopping for me tonight then you will have something for lunch tomorrow."
13. Challenge: Try to get others to comply by challenging them to do what you want. That is, try to gain their compliance by provoking, stimulating, tempting, goading, and/or galvanizing them to comply. Example: I didn't want to race until his car pulled beside mine and he revved the engine.
14. Compliment: Try to get others to comply by complimenting them on their abilities or accomplishments. That is, try to gain their compliance by praising them to get them to do what you want. Example: With that jump shot, you would be really good at basketball.
15. Compromise: Try to get others to comply by offering to compromise with them. That is, try to gain their compliance by making a concession to them so they'll make their concession to you and do what you want. Example: "I will drop you off at the airport if you will go to the dentist with me."
16. Cooperation: Try to get others to comply by being cooperative and collaborating with them. That is, try to gain their compliance not by telling the other person what to do but by offering to discuss things and work them out together. Example: "We should get the team together and brainstorm new ideas for this problem."
17. Criticize: Try to get others to comply by criticizing them. That is, try to gain their compliance by attacking them on a personal level to get them to do what you want. Example: "It looks like you're really gaining some weight, why don't you go on a run with me."
18. Debasement: Try to get others to comply by acting pitiful and pleading. That is, try to gain their compliance by debasing, demeaning, degrading, devaluing, humiliating, and/or lowering yourself so as to deprive yourself of esteem or self-worth to get them to do what you want. Example: "I am so stupid, I can't believe I deleted the report. Can you please go delay the presentation."
19. Debt: Try to get others to comply by reminding them they are in debt to you because of things you have done for them in the past. That is, try to gain their compliance by indicating that they owe it to you to do what you want. Example: "You should paid for my lunch, I bought your lunch last time."
20. Deceit: Try to get others to comply by misleading them. That is, try to gain their compliance by lying to or deceiving them. Example: "We told them the car was in perfect working order, but the transmission is about to go out."
21. Direct Request: Try to get others to comply by just making a direct request. That is, try to gain their compliance by simply asking or stating what you want without giving any reasons for them to comply. Example: "Can I use the computer?"
22. Disclaimer (Norms/Rules): Try to get others to comply by downplaying or disavowing restrictions and constraints that might prevent them from doing what you want them to do. That is, try to gain their compliance by pointing out that otherwise applicable procedures, rules, norms, and/or expectations should be broken in this instance. Example: "You should drive faster than the speed limit, this is an emergency!"
23. Disclaimer (Other): Try to get others to comply by downplaying or disavowing the ability of anyone else to do so. That is, try to gain their compliance by pointing out that other people can't help you or do what is needed. Example: "I would ask Ted for his help but we know that he is not good at presentations."
24. Disclaimer (Self): Try to get others to comply by downplaying or disavowing your reasons for asking. That is, try to gain their compliance by indicating that: (a) you do not want to make a bad impression nor do you have bad intentions, (b) you do not really want to make the request and you are only doing so reluctantly, and/or (c) you simply have no choice but to make the request. Example: "I'm sorry that I am asking you for money, I'm really not a beggar."
25. Disclaimer (Target): Try to get others to comply by acknowledging and sympathizing with why they may not want to do so. That is, try to gain their compliance by indicating that: (a) you understand and are aware of their reasons, feelings, and abilities, and/or (b) that you are sensitive to their needs and concerns even though you must ask them to do what you want. Example: "I know that you're disappointed that you can't go on the trip, but do you mind helping me get the presentation ready?"
26. Disclaimer (Task): Try to get others to comply by downplaying what you are asking them to do. That is, try to gain their compliance by indicating that what you want them to do isn't what they think it is and shouldn't pose a problem; it isn't awful, effortful, difficult, or dumb. Example: "Updating the database shouldn't take that much time."
27. Disclaimer (Time): Try to get others to comply by downplaying or disavowing being busy as a reason to refuse your request. That is, try to gain their compliance by pointing out that there is or soon will be enough time for them to do what you want. Example: "We should go to the store now, you can finish your report later."
28. Duty: Try to get others to comply by pointing out it is their duty to do so. That is, try to gain their compliance by stating they should fulfill obligations, responsibilities, and commitments that they have. Example: "Taking out the trash at the end of the day is a part of your job."
29. Equity: Try to get others to comply on the grounds that it is equitable to do so. That is, try to gain their compliance by pointing out that being fair, just, and impartial means they should do what you want. Example: "Your brother cleaned the house last time; it's your turn now."
30. Esteem (Negative) by Others: Try to get others to comply by pointing out that, if they do not do so, other people will think worse of them. That is, try to gain their compliance by noting that in the eyes of others they will be viewed more negatively if they do not do what you want. Example: "If you don't go to that college, other people will think you're going to a party school."
31. Esteem (Positive) by Others: Try to get others to comply by pointing out that, if they do so, other people will think better of them. That is, try to gain their compliance by noting that in the eyes of others they will be viewed more positively if they do what you want. Example: "If you play football, everyone will think that you're really tough."
32. Esteem (Negative) by Actor: Try to get others to comply by pointing out that, if they do not do so, you will think worse of them. That is, try to gain their compliance by noting that in your eyes they will be viewed more negatively if they do not do what you want. Example: "I would be really disappointed if you went to the party instead of studying."
33. Esteem (Positive) by Actor: Try to get others to comply by pointing out that, if they do so, you will think better of them. That is, try to gain their compliance by noting that in your eyes they will be viewed more positively if they do what you want. Example: "If you went to law school, I would have a new level of respect for you."
34. Expertise (Negative): Try to get others to comply by pointing out that because of the way the world works, unfavorable things will happen if they do not change their behavior. That is, try to gain their compliance by noting that in the natural course of things, bad outcomes will occur if they do not do what you want. Example: "You will get the flu, if you don't get a flu shot."
35. Expertise (Positive): Try to get others to comply by pointing out that because the way the world works, favorable things will happen if they change their behavior. That is, try to gain their compliance by noting that in the natural course of things, good outcomes will occur if they do what you want. Example: "If you work hard at your job, you're sure to get that promotion."
36. Hinting: Try to get others to comply by hinting around at what you want them to do. That is, try to gain their compliance by indicating indirectly what you want, hoping they will figure it out and comply even though you never come out and really say it. Example: "I left the trash by the front door, so Dan would take it out."
37. I Want: Try to get others to comply for no reason other than you want them to. That is, try to gain their compliance by telling them to do what you want because you desire it. Example: "I want you to go with me to the city."
38. Invoke Norm: Try to get others to comply by indicating they would be out of step with the norm if they didn't do what you want. That is, try to gain their compliance by prodding them to conform to what others have, do, or desire. Example: "Everyone is going to the gym after work."
39. It's Up to You: Try to get others to comply by telling them the decision is theirs to make and it's up to them. That is, try to gain their compliance by telling them the choice to comply is up to them. Example: "It's up to you to save your money, instead of spending it on video games."
40. Logical Empirical: Try to get others to comply by making logical arguments. That is, try to gain their compliance through the use of reasoning, evidence, facts, and data. Example: "Statistics show that non-smokers live longer than smokers."
41. Moral Appeal: Try to get others to comply by appealing to their moral or ethical standards. That is, try to gain their compliance by letting them know what is right and what is wrong. Example: "Don't buy those shoes they are made using child labor."
42. My Concern for You: Try to get others to comply because of your concern for them. That is, try to gain their compliance by referring to your regard for, consideration of, interest in, and feelings for them. Example: "Please go to the doctor, I'm worried about you."
43. Nature of Situation: Try to get others to comply by being attentive to the situation or circumstances you find yourselves in. That is, try to gain their compliance by taking note of the appropriateness of their behavior to the situation and/or the appropriateness of your request in the situation. Example: "I told my son that the bed was not a trampoline."
44. Negative Affect: Try to get others to comply by being really negative: expressing negative emotions, acting really unfriendly, and creating an unappealing impression. That is, try to gain their compliance by acting displeased to get them to do what you want. Example: "Angrily, I told her to put her phone on silent after it went off in class."
45. Not Seek Compliance: No attempt is made to get others to do what you want. That is, no compliance is sought. Example: "I didn't ask if I could go out tonight."
46. Persistence: Try to get others to comply by being persistent. That is, try to gain their compliance by persevering (continuing) in your attempts to get them to do what you want. Example: "After asking for over a year, we are finally getting a pool."
47. Personal Expertise: Try to get others to comply by referring to your credibility (your personal expertise). That is, try to gain their compliance based on your experience, know-how, trustworthiness, and judgment. Example: "You should get those shoes, I have them and they feel great when running.
48. Positive Affect: Try to get others to comply by being really positive: expressing positive emotions, acting really friendly, and creating an appealing impression. That is, try to gain their compliance by charming them into doing what you want. Example: "She was really happy, when she asked for a raise."
49. Pre-Giving: Try to get others to comply by doing positive and nice things for them in advance of asking them to do what you want. That is, try to gain their compliance by giving them things they'd like and then only afterwards making your request. Example: "I bought my wife flowers, then later asked if I could go fishing this weekend."
50. Promise: Try to get others to comply by making a promise. That is, try to gain their compliance by offering to give them a reward or something they'd like if they do what is wanted. Example: "If you behave in the store, I promise that we will stop for ice cream on the way home."
51. Promote Task: Try to get others to comply by promoting the value and worth of what you want them to do. That is, try to gain their compliance by identifying one or more positive qualities of the thing you are asking them to do (e.g., what you want them to do is important, meaningful, rewarding, enjoyable etc.). Example: "If you complete this presentation on time, you will be less stressed and will get a good grade."
52. Self-Feeling (Negative): Try to get others to comply by stating that not doing so will result in an automatic decrease in their self-worth. That is, try to gain their compliance by pointing out that they will feel worse about themselves if they do not do what you want. Example: "You will feel bad if you throw all that food away instead of donating it."
53. Self-Feeling (Positive): Try to get others to comply by stating that doing so will result in an automatic increase in their self-worth. That is, try to gain their compliance by pointing out that they will feel better about themselves if they do what you want. Example: "You will feel better if you donate that old coat to charity instead of selling it in the garage sale."
54. Suggest: Try to get others to comply by offering suggestions about what it is you want them to do. That is, try to gain their compliance by subtly proposing an idea that indirectly points out and describes what it is you want them to do. Example: "Why don't you try the steak instead of the chicken?"
55. Surveillance: Try to get others to comply by indicating your awareness and observation of what they do. That is, try to gain their compliance by referring to your general vigilance, surveillance, scrutiny, and/or monitoring of their behavior. Example: "I will find out if you're lying to me about the car accident."
56. Third Party: Try to get others to comply by having someone else ask them for you. That is, try to gain their compliance by getting someone else to intervene and do it for you. Example: "Jane don't you think Jim should go on that date with the girl from accounting."
57. This Is the Way Things Are: Try to get others to comply by telling them they have to because that is just the way things are. That is, try to gain their compliance by referring to rules, procedures, policies, or customs that require them to comply. Example: "You should slow down since the speed limit is only 25 mph."
58. Thought Manipulation: Try to get others to comply by convincing them that the request you are making is really their own idea. That is, try to gain their compliance by having them think they were the ones who really wanted to do it in the first place. Example: "We should go on the roller coaster, since you wanted to come to the fair in the first place."
59. Threat: Try to get others to comply by threatening them. That is, try to gain their compliance by saying you will punish them if they do not do what you want. Example: "If you go to the bar again tonight, consider us done."
60. Value Appeal: Try to get others to comply because of important values that compel action in this instance. That is, try to gain their compliance by pointing to central and joint beliefs that should guide what they do. Example: "Since we both care about the ocean, we should volunteer for the cleanup."
61. Warning: Try to get others to comply by warning them about what they are doing. That is, try to gain their compliance by alerting them to possible negative consequences of their behavior. Example: "You might get fired if you stay up all night."
62. Welfare (Others): Try to get others to comply by telling them how other people would be hurt if they do not do what you want. That is, try to gain their compliance by pointing out that the welfare of other people is at stake. Example: "If you are not going to be in the family photo then we won't take one."
63. Why Not?: Try to get others to comply by making them justify why they should not. That is, try to gain their compliance by pointing out there are no real grounds for not doing so. Example: "Why wouldn't you help your sister?"
64. Your Concern for Me: Try to get others to comply because of their concern for you. That is, try to gain their compliance by referring to their regard for, consideration of, interest in, and feelings for you. Example: "If you really cared for me then you would go to the dance recital."
