= Goals, plans, action theory =

The Goals, Plans, Action theory explains how people use influence over others to accomplish their goals. This theory is prominent in the field of interpersonal communication. The theory is a model for how individuals gain compliance from others. There can be multiple goals related to the need for compliance. These goals are separated into primary and secondary categories. These goals are then translated into plans, both strategic and tactical, and finally carried out in actions. Goals motivate plans, and actions deliver the effort to accomplish goals. The model is rooted in the scientific tradition, with scientific realism, the assumption that “much of the world is patterned, knowable, and objective." The Goals, Plans, Action theory has shown application in academic and personal relationships.

== Background ==
The Goals, Plans, Action theory was first drafted by James Price Dillard in 1990 in his book Seeking Compliance: The Production of Interpersonal Influence Messages. Since then, several amendments to the theory have been made by Dillard and other communications scholars.

== Assumptions ==
The Goals, Plans, Action theory makes the following assumptions: individuals are predictable, goals are based on deeper values, and their behavior is intentional. As a practical theory, the Goals, Plans, Action theory assumes that the world is knowable. Individuals will follow certain objective cognitive processes that result in their behavior. In addition, goals are the tangible product of values. The individual's attitude, beliefs, and cultural background inform their goals. Finally, individuals are deliberate in their actions: the greater the desire to accomplish their objective, the harder they will work.

== Concepts ==
The Goals, Plans, Action theory includes the following concepts: the individual has at least one of seven primary goals along with one of five secondary goals, and plans are both thoughtful and actionable. The Goals, Plans, Action theory declares that individuals knowingly act in order to accomplish a certain outcome. The 'why' behind their behavior is known. Individuals may be acting upon multiple goals at a time, dependent on current circumstances. These goals, both primary and secondary, may conflict with one another, and may change over time. In a relationship, as the individual seeks to influence the other, they will look to familiar plans and actions first. If those plans and actions do not meet their needs, they will branch out.

=== Goals ===
==== Primary goals ====
There are seven primary goals that drive plans, and ultimately lead to action. These goals are defined as primary because they are found at the beginning of the goal attainment process. Primary goals allow an individual to bracket the interaction. They are also referred to as influence goals as they are the key ways an individual might impact another person. The primary goals are: gain assistance, give advice, share activity, change orientation, change relationship, obtain permission, and enforce rights and obligations. With each of the goals, the individual is intending to provide or obtain something to further their relationship with the other person. Differences in primary and secondary goals can be understood from different perspectives. From the research perspective, the primary and influence goals are the chief purpose of interaction. The primary goal triggers the consideration and incorporates secondary goals.

==== Secondary goals ====
Secondary goals are derivative of primary goals: without a primary goal, no secondary goals exist. Secondary goals directly apply to the actions of the individual in the Goals, Plans, Action model. There are five secondary goals: identity, conversation management, relational resource, personal resource, and affect management. Identity goals are based on the individual's self-concept. Conversation management goals pertain to how the individual behaves around others. Relational resource goals depend on the individual's value of relationships. Personal resource goals focus on the physical and material well-being of the individual. Affect management goals pertain to managing emotions and feelings during a conversation.

=== Plans ===
Plans exist at two levels: strategic and tactical. Strategic plans indicate what should be accomplished. Tactical plans indicate how that will be done. The strategies are general while the tactics are specific. Influence plans include guidelines for verbal and non-verbal communication. Based on strategic communication theory, an individual searches for preexisting templates to adapt current situation. An example of a strategic plan might be to ask for help, while a tactical plan would be to list out your previous attempts and explain what you aren't able to do.

=== Action ===
In this theory, action can be taken through both verbal and non-verbal messages. There are four dimensions of actions: explicitness, dominance, argument, and control over outcomes. Explicitness refers to how clear the message is. The easier the message is to understand, the better the results are likely to be. Dominance refers to the amount of control the individual has over the other. The more power they have, the more likely they are to get what they want. Argument refers to the justification behind the message. The better the reasoning, the better the chances of accomplishing their goal(s). Control over outcomes refers to how much say the individual has in what happens next. The more jurisdiction they have, the more likely they are to see their intended results.

== Applications ==
=== Academic relationships ===
The Goals, Plans, Action theory was applied to academics in Henningson et al.'s study of interactions between students and professors regarding disappointing grades. In the study, the primary goal is to ask for reconsideration of the score. Secondary goals included conversation management and relationship resource management. The students didn't want their professors to think worse of them because of the conversation, and wanted to maintain or improve their relationship with them. Planning was measured using questions about the students' strategy for their conversation with their professors. Through the study, Henningson et al. were able to prove the Goals, Plans, Action theory in the context of appealing a grade. The decision to appeal was based on thoughtful intentions, come to life through specific plans. However, the actual attempt of discussing the grade with the professor only occurred 16.8% of the time.

Another study examined how the GPA model applies to peer confrontation and whistle-blowing in class. Henningsen et al. experimented with undergraduate students at a Midwestern University. Henningsen et al. identified that in confronting a peer cheating, the primary goal should be to stop the peer from cheating. Henningsen et al. explained secondary goals as identity, conversation management, personal resource, relational resource, and affect management goals. The primary and secondary goals motivate an individual to plan the communication; plans are conversational mental guidelines. In terms of action, a student can explicitly confront peers and reach out to instructors regarding academic misconduct. In addition, Henningsen et al. also explained sex differences in academic misconduct. The results using the GPA model show that participants are more likely to act when a cheating peer is in the same group; however, whistle-blowing was not endorsed, and the sex of the cheating peer did not influence the likelihood of the cheater being explicitly confronted or whistle-blown to a course instructor.

==== Class Exercise ====
Recent studies explored GPA in classrooms. Gan proposed teaching and adapting the GPA model through negotiation exercises. Gan finds evidence that schools successfully integrated conflict resolution into the curriculum and enhanced academic performance. He suggests that learning to negotiate should not stop at High School since it is a critical academic skill. The proposed study focuses on developing learning objectives that give students an idea of actions they should master by the end of the exercise. Implementing the GPA model can be challenging since a student will focus on launching her primary goal(s) and consider her secondary goal(s). The goal is to train students to be fully prepared for all situations and to be mental fitness, highlighting the importance of having the skill during negotiation.

Seiter et al. also proposed an in-class exercise, adapting Pokémon GO, Persuasion GO, to train students to gain awareness of persuasion tactics. Like Gan, Seiter et al. suggest that toward the end of the exercise, instructors might discuss the GPA model and assist students in understanding how to use different tactics under scenarios.

=== Personal relationships ===
The Goals, Plans, Action theory has also been applied to personal relationships. In a study analyzing voicemail messages after hypothetical problematic events in relationships, Samp and Solomon researched how the subjects came to their final message. The study determined that relational partners (both romantic and not) had specific intentions that drove their voicemail messages after a hypothetical problematic event. Primary goals identified in the study were to change orientation, change relationship, obtain permission, and enforce rights and obligations. Secondary goals included all five of those identified in the theory: identity, conversation management, relational resource, personal resource, and affect management. Through the study Samp and Solomon also found that goal features had a significant effect on the communication: more complex goals led more intricate, longer messages. Their conclusions help to understand how individuals gain compliance in relationships during difficult situations.

=== Health Communication ===
LeBelle and Ball researched college students' intervention of peers’ misuse of prescription stimulants. They found previous studies revealing that nearly 65% of misuse of prescription stimulants was first introduced in college. Other studies have indicated that prescription stimulants are an acceptable and safe approach to succeed in academic performance, often misused due to shared communication among students. Peer intervention is well-researched in health communication; for the study, LaBelle and Ball distributed the survey to college students and asked them to read different scenarios, examined how college students hold goals and strategic message plans to intervene close friends' engagement in prescription stimulants for academic recreational, or appetite suppressant motives. Results and statistical analysis indicate that increasing students’ confidence in intervention would likely result in successful peer intervention.

Rusell et al. conducted a study on the patient's misunderstanding of end-of-life (EOL) care using a mixed goals theory, including Dillard's definitions of goals to understand health illiteracy-strengthened misunderstanding of EOL care. Results show that medical providers’ goals are primarily task-oriented and focused on taking action. Findings from this study aligned with the previous multiple goals framework, including the GPA model.

Gebhard et al. reported an experimental study in the GMS Journal for Medical Education in Germany by developing the COMSKIL Communication Skills Training Program and then adapting theoretical foundations training by implementing the goals-plans-action theory, sociolinguistics theory, and the lay-etiological “common sense model of illness”, relating to illness-related self-regulation. Results reveal a satisfactory conclusion regarding the COMSKIL application at medical universities.

== Critiques ==
Since the development of the theory, scholars have called into question its ability to explain human behavior.

Gregory Shepherd argues that communication is not always driven by goals, but can be seen as a mere social interaction. He states that if it were, there could be no unplanned or purposeless actions. In response, Dillard and Schrader distinguish between action (purposeful) and other types of behavior (purposeless).

Hairong Feng questions the simplicity of the theory, expressing that the framework is too vague for the complicated psychological activity involved in communication. However, she does find the idea of primary and secondary goals to be aligned with other theories.
