= Context collapse =

Academic concept used in communication

Context collapse or "the flattening of multiple audiences into a single context" is a term arising out of the study of human interaction on the internet, especially within social media. Context collapse "generally occurs when a surfeit of different audiences occupy the same space, and a piece of information intended for one audience finds its way to another" with that new audience's reaction being uncharitable and highly negative for failing to understand the original context.

== History ==
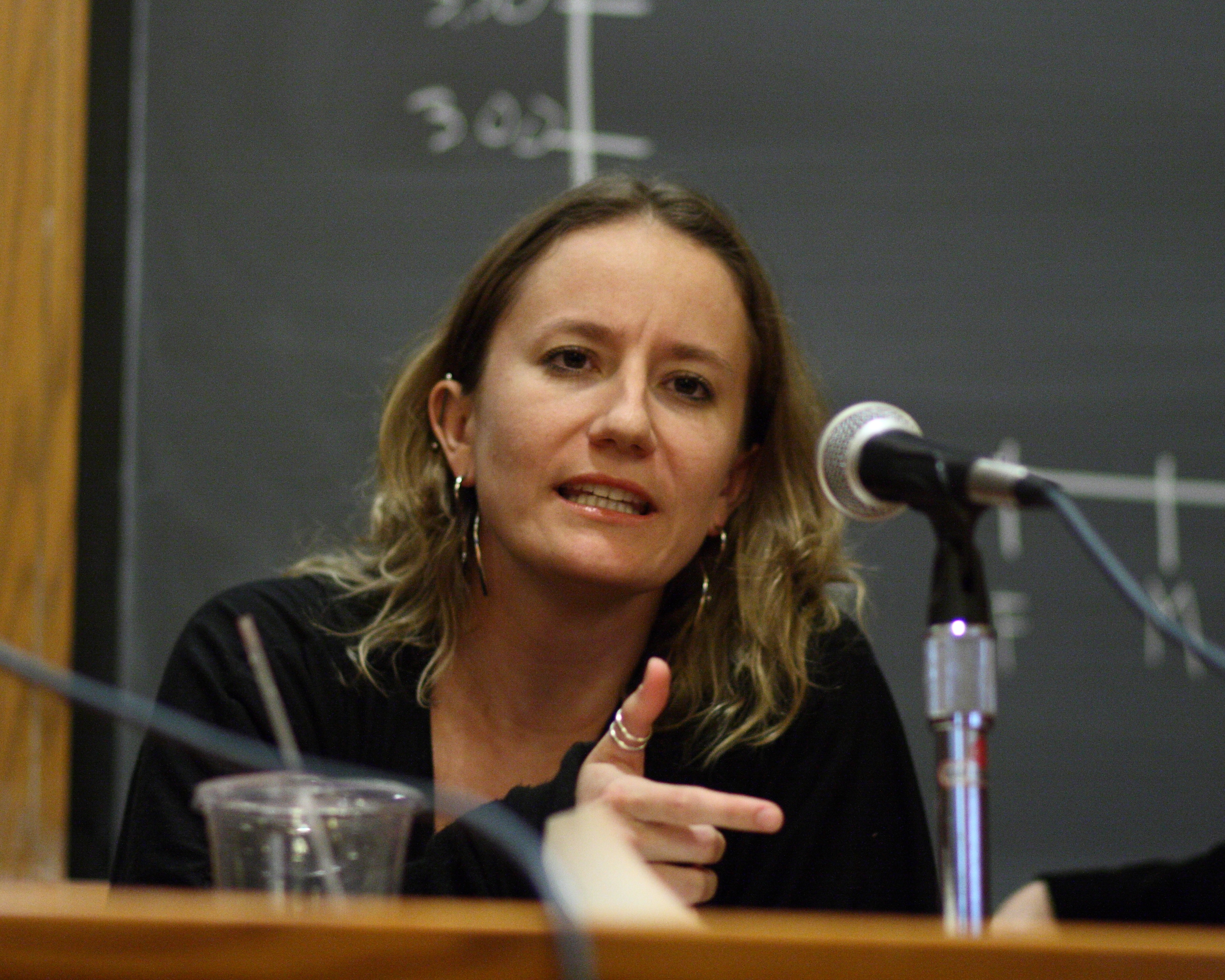
Danah Boyd at the Writers on Writing About Technology roundtable at Yale University in 2009

The term grew out of the work of Erving Goffman and Joshua Meyrowitz. In his book No Sense of Place (1985), Meyrowitz first applied the concept to media like television and the radio. He claimed that this new kind of technology broke barriers between different kinds of audiences as the content being produced was broadcast widely. In The Presentation of Self in Everyday Life, Erving Goffman argues that individuals develop "audience segregation" whereby they make sure that they segregate one audience to whom they perform one role from the other audiences to whom they play a different role. Context collapse arises out of the failure to do so. This is partly because of the inclination to imply during an interaction that one's performance is their most important role performance (an impression that would collapse if different audiences to whom one performs differently were to be integrated) and that there is a uniqueness to one's relationship and role performance to a given audience.

Michael Wesch used the term context collapse in his 2008 lecture "An Anthropological Introduction to YouTube." The term was first used in print by Alice Marwick, Danah Boyd, and Wesch.

== In social media ==
The concept of context collapse has become much more prominent with the rise of social media because many of these platforms, like Twitter, restrict users from specifically identifying and determining their audience. On Twitter, context collapse is seen with the retweeting functionality. When a public user posts a social media post known as a 'tweet', it can be retweeted by anyone, thus introducing the content to a new audience. To avoid any unwanted attention, some users may resort to the 'lowest common denominator' approach. This is when a user may only post content online they know would be appropriate for all of their audience members.

== Types of context collapse ==
As defined by sociologists Jenny L. Davis and Nathan Jurgenson, there are two main types of context collapse: context collusions and context collisions. Context collusions are considered to be intentional while context collisions are considered to be unintentional.

An example of context collusion offline may be a wedding where different social circles are purposefully combined. Online, context collusion is seen on social media sites like Facebook where one may create a post to garner attention from various social groups.

Context collision is seen in the case where someone makes a joke about someone else, not realizing they are also listening. On the web, an example of context collision is when companies accidentally make private information about their users available.

== Effects of context collapse ==
Studies show that context collapse generates a range of negative emotional states and defensive behavioral strategies.

The dominant emotional effect of context collapse is anxiety associated with "imagined surveillance" and imaginary audience. Before publishing content, users may ask themselves: "What will others think?", "Are there any aunts or uncles among friends, is it appropriate?". This constant internal reflection and need to anticipate possible criticism turns the process of self-presentation into a source of permanent emotional stress. Also, it brings a strong feeling of loss of control and helplessness. This is particularly evident in situations of contextual collisions, for example, in the case of unwanted tagging in embarrassing photos. The result of these two previous factors is a sense of inauthenticity and inner conflict. Young users perceive their identity on Facebook as limited and inauthentic in their eyes, compared to the more expansive and authentic identity they have on Instagram, where their audience is more homogeneous. The key emotional consequence is experiencing embarrassment and shame at the moment of the immediate realization of the collapse – when content intended for one audience becomes the property of another.

As for different specialized strategies in navigating context collapse, there is also a range of them. The self-censorship strategy represents a primary form of context adaptation. This involves sharing only "safe", generic, or non-controversial content that minimizes social risk across diverse audience groups. Besides, active audience segmentation through filtering and grouping within one platform constitutes a core relational boundary restoration strategy. One more solution is maintaining multiple spaces via separate accounts or platforms that is a more sophisticated privacy boundary strategy. This may involve operating multiple accounts on a single platform. Also, it may involve distributing activity across platforms with differing privacy norms. Moreover, users may control their digital history by deleting or hiding old posts, or by utilizing temporal features like Stories that limit content persistence.

== See also ==
- Contextual Integrity
- Poe's law
