= Michael Wesch =

American cultural anthropologist

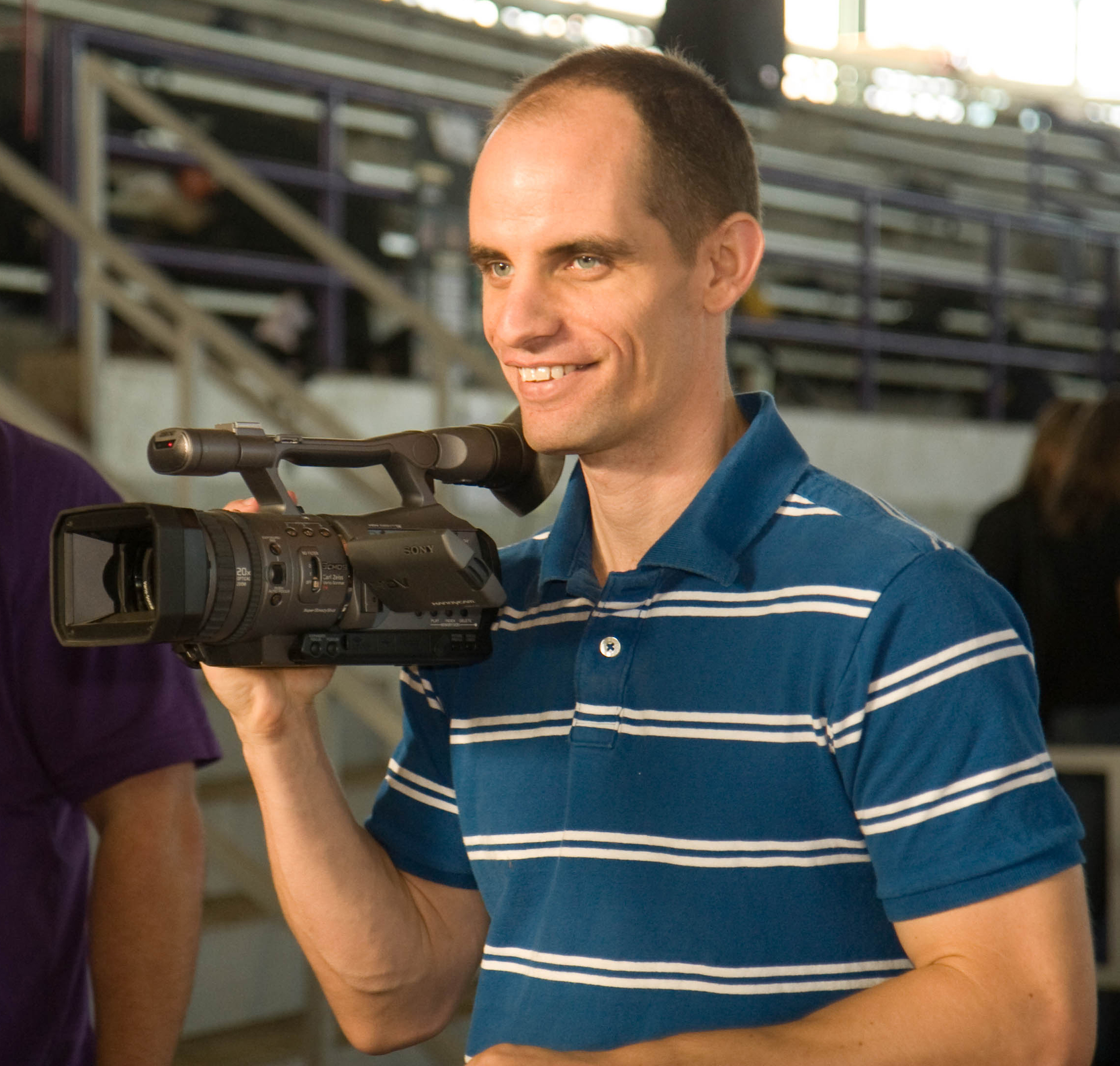
- Wesch in 2008
- Born: Michael Lee Wesch; Fairbury, Nebraska
- Education: Kansas State University, University of Virginia
- Occupation: anthropology professor
- Years active: 2004-present
- Employer: Kansas State University
- Known for: Teaching methods, YouTube videos
- Title: Professor of Cultural Anthropology
- Predecessor: Harald Prins
- Awards: 2008 CASE/Carnegie U.S. Professor of the Year for Doctoral and Research Universities
- Website: mediatedcultures.net

Michael Lee Wesch is a professor of cultural anthropology and University Distinguished Teaching Scholar at Kansas State University. He is known for teaching with new media and for creating videos published on YouTube about digital technology, including "The Machine is Us/ing Us" (2007), and "An Anthropological Introduction to YouTube" (2008).

== Career ==
Wesch is a cultural anthropologist and media ecologist exploring the effects of new media on human interaction. He graduated summa cum laude from the Kansas State University Anthropology Program in 1997 and returned as a faculty member in 2004 after receiving his PhD in Anthropology at the University of Virginia. There he pursued research on social and cultural change in Melanesia, focusing on the introduction of print and print-based practices like mapping and census-taking in the remote Mountain Ok region of Papua New Guinea where he lived for a total of 18 months from 1999-2003. This work inspired Wesch to examine the effects of new media more broadly, especially digital media. Also as a consequence of this trip, Wesch has gained some command of the Tok Pisin language, a primary lingua franca of Papua New Guinea.

Wesch launched the Digital Ethnography Working Group, a team of undergraduates at Kansas State University exploring human uses of digital technology. Coinciding with the launch of this group, Wesch created a short video, "The Machine is Us/ing Us" released on YouTube on January 31, 2007. In June 2008 Wesch presented "An Anthropological Introduction to YouTube" to the US Library of Congress. Wesch drew on the work of his students to present unique ideas and discoveries about the social impact of YouTube and socially networked media generally.

Wesch's videos are part of his broader efforts to pursue the possibilities of digital media to extend and transform the way ethnographies are presented. Wesch has also developed teaching methods, such as in his Introduction to Cultural Anthropology class at Kansas State University, where he began developing coursework in 2004 that includes students participating in a "world simulation" assignment. He is known for using digital technology in class assignments and has also emphasized "It doesn't matter what method you use if you do not first focus on one intangible factor: the bond between professor and student."

Currently he is the coordinator for the Peer Review of Teaching Project at Kansas State University, part of a broader nationwide consortium of universities pursuing new ways to improve and evaluate student learning. He is also working with the Educause Center for Applied Research on "The Tower and the Cloud" project, examining "the question of how higher education institutions (The Tower) may interoperate with the emerging network-based business and social paradigm (The Cloud)."

== Honors and awards ==
For his work with video, Wesch has won a Wired Magazine Rave Award in 2007 and the John Culkin Award for Outstanding Media Praxis from the Media Ecology Association.

On 20 November 2008, CASE and the Carnegie Foundation for the Advancement of Teaching honored Wesch as Professor of the Year.

== Selected work ==
- Whitehead, Neil Lancelot; Wesch, Michael, eds. (2012). Human No More: digital subjectivities, unhuman subjects, and the end of anthropology. Boulder: University Press of Colorado. ISBN 9781607321705.
- Wesch, Michael (2018). The Art of Being Human. New Prairie Press. ISBN 9781944548131.

== See also ==
- Context collapse
