= Dramaturgy (sociology) =

Sociological perspective

Dramaturgy is a sociological perspective that analyzes micro-sociological accounts of everyday social interactions through the analogy of performativity and theatrical dramaturgy, dividing such interactions between "actors", "audience" members, and various "front" and "back" stages.

The term was first adapted into sociology from the theatre by Erving Goffman, who developed most of the related terminology and ideas in his 1956 book, The Presentation of Self in Everyday Life. Kenneth Burke, whom Goffman would later acknowledge as an influence, had earlier presented his notions of dramatism in 1945, which in turn derives from Shakespeare. The fundamental difference between Burke's and Goffman's view, however, is that Burke believed that life was in fact theatre, whereas Goffman viewed theatre as a metaphor. If people imagine themselves as directors observing what goes on in the theatre of everyday life, they are doing what Goffman called dramaturgical analysis, the study of social interaction in terms of theatrical performance.

In dramaturgical sociology, it is argued that the elements of human interactions are dependent upon time, place, and audience. In other words, to Goffman, the self is a sense of who one is, a dramatic effect emerging from the immediate scene being presented. Goffman forms a theatrical metaphor in defining the method in which one human being presents itself to another based on cultural values, norms, and beliefs. Performances can have disruptions (actors are aware of such), but most are successful. The goal of this presentation of self is acceptance from the audience through carefully conducted performance. If the actor succeeds, the audience will view the actor as he or she wants to be viewed.

A dramaturgical action is a social action that is designed to be seen by others and to improve one's public self-image. In addition to Goffman, this concept has been used by Jürgen Habermas and Harold Garfinkel, among others.

== Overview ==
The theatrical metaphor can be seen in the origins of the word person, which comes from the Latin persona, meaning 'a mask worn by actors'. One behaves differently (plays different roles) in front of different people (audiences). A person picks out clothing (a costume) that is consistent with the image they wish to project. They enlist the help of friends, caterers, and decorators (fellow actors and stage crew) to help them successfully "stage" a dinner for a friend, a birthday party for a relative, or a gala for a fundraiser. If they need to adjust their clothing or wish to say something unflattering about one of their guests, they are careful to do so out of sight of others (backstage). One's presentation of oneself to others is known as dramaturgy.

Dramaturgical perspective is one of several sociological paradigms separated from other sociological theories or theoretical frameworks because, rather than examining the cause of human behavior, it analyzes the context. This is, however, debatable within sociology.

In Frame Analysis (1974), Goffman writes, "What is important is the sense he [a person or actor] provides them [the others or audience] through his dealing with them of what sort of person he is behind the role he is in." The dramaturgical perspective can be seen as an anchor to this perspective, wherein the individual's identity is performed through role(s) and consensus between the actor and the audience. Because of this dependence on consensus to define social situations, the perspective argues that there is no concrete meaning to any interaction that could not be redefined. Dramaturgy emphasizes expressiveness as the main component of interactions; it is thus termed as the "fully two-sided view of human interaction."

Dramaturgical theory suggests that a person's identity is not a stable and independent psychological entity, but rather, it is constantly remade as the person interacts with others. In a dramaturgical model, social interaction is analyzed in terms of how people live their lives, like actors performing on a stage.

This analysis offers a look at the concepts of status, which is like a part in a play; and role, which serves as a script, supplying dialogue and action for the characters. Just as on the stage, people in their everyday lives manage settings, clothing, words, and nonverbal actions to give a particular impression to others. Goffman described each individual's "performance" as the presentation of self; a person's efforts to create specific impressions in the minds of others. This process is also sometimes called impression management.

Goffman makes an important distinction between front stage behaviour, which are actions that are visible to the audience and are part of the performance; and back stage behavior, which are actions that people engage in when no audience is present. For example, a server in a restaurant is likely to perform one way in front of customers but might be much more casual in the kitchen. It is likely that he or she does things in the kitchen that might seem unseemly in front of customers.

Before interaction with another, an individual prepares a role, or impression, that he or she wants to make on the other. These roles are subject to what is, in theater, termed breaking character. Inopportune intrusions may occur in which a backstage performance is interrupted by someone who is not meant to see it. In addition, there are examples of how the audience for any personal performance plays a part in determining the course it takes: how typically people ignore many performance flaws out of tact, such as if someone trips or spits as they speak.

Within dramaturgy analysis, teams are groups of individuals who cooperate with each other in order to share the 'party line.' Team members must share information as mistakes reflect on everyone. Team members also have inside knowledge and are not fooled by one another's performances.

== Perinbanayagam's dramaturgical theory ==
Signifying Act: Sign: (Symbolic Meaning)/(Vocal Gesture) Meaning/Object

— Robert Perinbanayagam

== Performance ==
There are seven important elements Goffman identifies with respect to the performance:

1. Belief in the part that one is playing: Belief is important, even if it cannot be judged by others; the audience can only try to guess whether the performer is sincere or cynical.
2. The front (or mask): a standardized, generalizable, and transferable technique for the performer to control the manner in which the audience perceives them. People put on different masks throughout their lives.
3. Dramatic realization: a portrayal of aspects of the performer that they want the audience to know. When the performer wants to stress something, they will carry on the dramatic realization, e.g. showing how accomplished one is when going on a date to make a good first impression.
4. Idealization: a performance often presents an idealized view of the situation to avoid confusion (misrepresentation) and strengthen other elements (e.g., fronts, dramatic realization). Audiences often have an 'idea' of what a given situation (performance) should look like, and performers will try to carry out the performance according to that idea.
5. Maintenance of expressive control: the need to stay 'in character'. The performance has to make sure that they send out the correct signals, as well as silencing the occasional compulsion to convey misleading ones that might detract from the performance.
6. Misrepresentation: the danger of conveying a wrong message. The audience tends to think of a performance as genuine or false, and performers generally wish to avoid having an audience disbelieve them (whether they are being truly genuine or not).
7. Mystification: the concealment of certain information from the audience, whether to increase the audience's interest in the user or to avoid divulging information which could be damaging to the performer.

== Stages ==
Stages or regions refer to the three distinct areas where different individuals with different roles and information can be found. There are three stages: front, back, and outside.

=== Front stage ===
Within society, individuals are expected to present themselves in a certain way; however, when a person goes against the norm, society tends to notice. Therefore, individuals are expected to put on a costume and act differently when in front of the 'audience'. Goffman noticed this habit of society and developed the idea of front stage.

In his book The Presentation of Self in Everyday Life, Goffman defines front as "that part of the individual's performance which regularly functions in a general and fixed fashion to define the situation for those who observe the performance. Front, then, is the expressive equipment of a standard kind intentionally or unwittingly employed by the individual during his performance."

During the front stage, the actor formally performs and adheres to conventions that have meaning to the audience. It is a part of the dramaturgical performance that is consistent and contains generalized ways to explain the situation or role the actor is playing to the audience that observes it. The actor knows that they are being watched and acts accordingly.

Goffman explains that the front stage involves a differentiation between setting and personal front, two concepts that are necessary for the actor to have a successful performance. Setting is the scene that must be present in order for the actor to perform; if it is gone, the actor cannot perform. Personal front consists of items or equipment needed in order to perform. These items are usually identifiable by the audience as a constant representation of the performance and actor. The personal front is divided into two different aspects:

1. appearance, which refers to the items of the personal front that are a reflection of the actor's social status; and
2. manners, which refers to the way an actor conducts themselves. The actor's manner tells the audience what to expect from their performance.

=== Back stage ===
In The Presentation of Self in Everyday Life, Goffman explains that the back stage is where "the performer can relax; he can drop his front, forgo speaking in his lines, and step out of character." When the individual returns to the back stage, they feel a sense of relief knowing the actions that would not be condoned in the front stage are free to be expressed. In the backstage, actions are not to please anyone but the self. Back stage is where performers are present but audience is not, hence the performers can step out of character without fear of disrupting the performance. It is where various kinds of informal actions, or facts suppressed in the front stage, may appear. Simply put, the back stage is completely separate from the front stage, and it is where the performance of a routine is prepared. No members of the audience may appear in the back, and the actor takes many methods to ensure this.

Back region is a relative term, in that it exists only in regards to a specific audience: where two or more people are present, there will almost never be a true 'back region'.

=== Off-stage ===
Outside, or off-stage, is the place where individuals who are outsiders are not involved in the performance (although they may not be aware of it). The off-stage is where individual actors meet the audience members independently of the team performance on the front stage. Specific performances may be given when the audience is segmented as such.

=== Borders/regions ===
Borders, or boundaries, are important as they prevent or restrict movement of individuals between various regions. Performers need to be able to maneuver boundaries to manage who has the access to the performance, when and how. The border phenomenon is highlighted by Victor Turner's concept of liminality, and thus prolonged in the imaginable field: semiotics of ritual.

The management of thresholds may be operated on several axes; the most crude is exclusion-inclusion, similar to the basic digital on-off (1 – 0). To be a part or not may be seen as the fundamental asset in a society, but as far society is perceived as a rhizomatic conglomerate, rather such than a unitary or arborescent whole. Border-control, so to speak, becomes in a paradoxical fashion the central issue. Thus the study of liminality in sociology, ritual and theatre reveals the fictional elements underpinning society. Rites of passage seem to reflect this as the enactments of exclusion, and dissociation seem to be an essential feature of such. The enactment of exclusion from a society seem to be essential for the formation of an imaginary central governing (cf. Michel Foucault).

== Discrepant roles ==
Many performances need to prevent the audience from getting some information (secrets). For that, several specialized roles are created.

=== Secrets ===
There are different types of secrets that have to be concealed for various reasons:

- Dark secrets: represent information about the performing team which could contradict the image the team is presenting to the audience.
- Strategic secrets: represent the team's goals, capabilities and know-hows which allows the team to control the audience and lead it in the direction the team desires.
- Inside secrets: represent information known by the team and are seen as something that is shared only with other teammates to increase team bonding.
- Entrusted secrets: secrets have to be kept in order to maintain the role and team integrity; keeping them demonstrates trustworthiness.
- Free secrets: the secrets of another, unrelated to oneself, that can be disclosed while still maintaining the role. Disclosure of such secrets should not affect the performance.

=== Roles ===
There are three basic roles in Goffman's scheme, each centered on who has access to what information: performers are most knowledgeable; audiences know only what the performers disclosed and what they have observed themselves; and outsiders have little if any relevant information.

These roles can be divided into three groups:

1. Roles dealing with manipulation information and team borders:
  - The informer: a pretender to the role of a team member who gains teams trust, is allowed backstage, but then joins the audience and discloses information on the performance. Example: spies, traitors.
  - The shill: this role is an opposite of the informer; the shill pretends to be a member of the audience but is a member of the performing team. His role is to manipulate the audience reactions.
  - The spotter: a member of the audience who has much information about the performance in general. The spotter analyzes the performers and may reveal information to the audience. Example: food critic in a restaurant.
2. Roles dealing with facilitating interactions between two other teams:
  - The go-between or mediator: usually acts with the permission of both sides, acting as a mediator and/or messenger, facilitating communication between various teams. Go-between learn many secrets, and may not be neutral.
3. Roles that mix front and back region up:
  - The non-person: individuals who are present during the performance, may even be allowed in the back stage but are not part of the 'show'. Their role is usually obvious and thus they are usually ignored by the performers and the audience. Example: a waiter, cleaning lady.
  - The service specialist: individuals whose specialized services are required, usually by the performers. They are often invited by the performers to the back region. Example: hairdresser, plumbers, bankers with tax knowledge.
4. "The colleague: individuals who are similar to the performers but are not members of the team in question. Example: coworkers.
  - The confidant: individuals to whom the performer reveals details of the performance.

== Communication out of character ==
Performers may communicate out of character on purpose, in order to signal to others on their team, or by accident.

Common backstage out-of-character communications include:

- Treatment of the absent: derogatory discussion of the absent audience or performers affecting team cohesion.
- Staging talk: discussion of technical aspects of the performance, gossip.

Common frontstage communications out of character include:

- Team collusion: between team members, during the performance but not endangering it. Example: staging cues, kicking a friend under a table.
- Realigning actions: between members of opposing teams. For example: unofficial grumbling.

== Impression management ==
Impression management refers to work on maintaining the desired impression, and is composed of defensive and protective techniques. Protective techniques are used in order to cover mistakes, only once the interaction begins. For example, relying on audience to use tact and overlook mistakes of the performers. In contrast, defensive techniques are employed before an interaction begins, and involves:

- Dramaturgical loyalty: work to keep the team members loyal to the team members and to the performance itself.
- Dramaturgical discipline: dedicating oneself to the performance but without losing oneself in it. Self-control, making sure one can play the part properly, rehearsal.
- Dramaturgical circumspection: minimizing risk by preparing for expected problems. Being careful to avoid situations where a mistake or a potential problem can occur, choosing the right audience, length and venue of performance.

== Criticism ==
Believing that theories should not be applied where they have not been tested, it has been argued that dramaturgy should only be applied in instances that involve people associated with a total institution, for which the theory was designed.

In addition to this, it also has been said that dramaturgy does not contribute to sociology's goal of understanding the legitimacy of society. It is claimed to be drafting on positivism, which does not offer an interest in both reason and rationality. John Welsh called it a "commodity."

== Application ==
Research on dramaturgy is best done through fieldwork such as participant observation.

For one, dramaturgy has been used to depict how social movements communicate power. Robert D. Benford and Scott A. Hunt argued that "social movements can be described as dramas in which protagonists and antagonists compete to affect audiences' interpretations of power relations in a variety of domains." The people seeking power present their front stage self in order to captivate attention. However, the back stage self is still present, though undetectable. This is a competition of power, a prime example of dramaturgy.

A useful, and everyday way of understanding dramaturgy (specifically front stage and back stage) is to think of a waiter or waitress at a restaurant. The main avenue of concern for the waiter is "customer service." Even if a customer is rude, one is expected to be polite ("the customer is always right") as part of their job responsibilities. They speak differently when going out to the break room: they may complain, mimic and discuss with their fellow peers how irritating and rude the customer is. In this example, the waiter acts a certain way when dealing with customers and acts a completely different way when with her/his fellow employees.

Dramaturgy has also been applied to the emerging interdisciplinary domain of scholarly research known as technoself studies, which deals with human identity in a technological society.

In terms of social media profiles, users and their followers share a social space online. Social media users create profiles and post things that are specifically curated to portray a certain image that they want their followers to see. Often times this curated image is a facade. This is an "authoritative performance" of ones lifestyle. A dynamic is created between the user and their followers where the user is in control of how and what represents them, while the followers are spectators to this presentation of the user's self but they themselves are also presenting themselves in the same way.

Dramaturgy can also be applied to all aspects of theatre performers.

== See also ==
- Epistemic virtue
- Role engulfment
- Signalling theory
