= Alice Marwick =

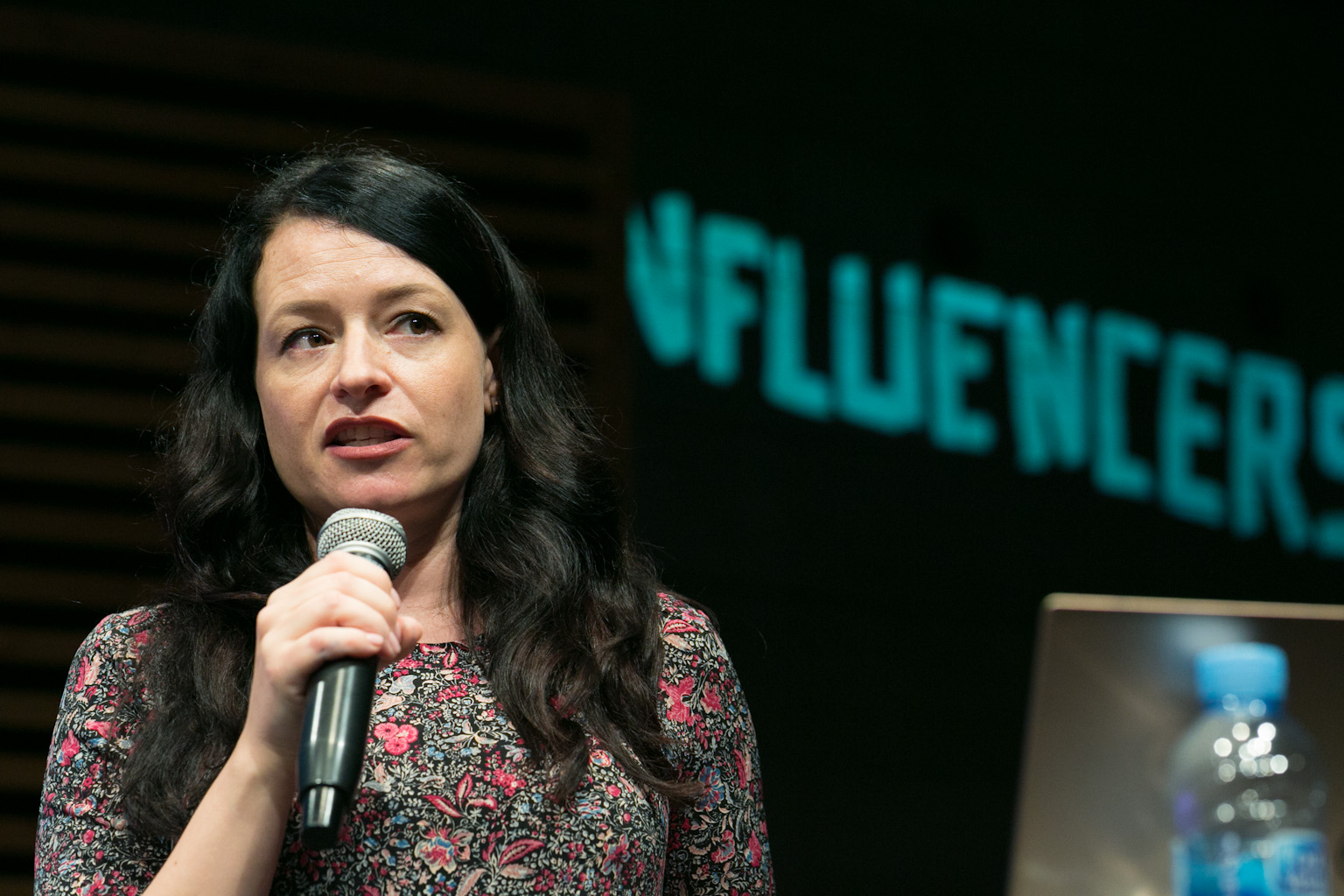
Alice Marwick in 2017

Alice E. Marwick is a communication scholar, academic, and author, who currently works as an Associate Professor in the Communication department and Principal Researcher at the Center for Information, Technology and Public Life at the University of North Carolina at Chapel Hill, and an affiliated researcher with the Data and Society Research Institute. Marwick has written for publications such as the New York Times, and the Guardian. Her works include the examination of politics, race, social media and gender. She has been a keynote speaker for various universities throughout the United States.

== Education ==
Marwick graduated with her political science and women's studies bachelor's degree from Wellesley College in Massachusetts in 1998. She received her Master of Arts degree in communication from the University of Washington in 2005. She received her PhD in the Department of Media, Culture and Communication from New York University in 2010.

== Written works ==
She has written for the New York Review of Books. Marwick has authored two books: Status Update: Celebrity, Publicity and Branding in the Social Media Age (2013) and The Private Is Political: Networked Privacy and Social Media (2023). She also co-edited The Sage Handbook of Social Media (2016) with co-editors, Jean Burgess and Thomas Poell.

In Status Update, Marwick draws on ethnographic data from people within the San Francisco tech scene and examines how people use social media to obtain attention and popularity to reach a higher social standing. A review from the American Library Association says that her book is important because it takes a needed female perspective on a world that is misogynistic with its technological feats. Status Update includes an extensive examination of the phenomenon of Internet celebrity.

In The Private is Political, Marwick develops the theory of “networked privacy” to account for the ways that privacy can be compromised in—and across—social media platforms. The book highlights the social justice implications of privacy loss, particularly for marginalized groups.

In the Sage Handbook of Social Media, the authors emphasize the importance of social media within contemporary societies and examines its history to scholars and students, while examining the use of social media within multiple fields from marketing, to protesting, to political campaigns.

== Other works ==
Marwick was a postdoctoral researcher at Microsoft Research New England. She was the former director of the McGannon Communication Research Center at Fordham University.

She has participated in podcasts examining far-right extremism, misinformation online, and the analyzation of the liberal left and the conservative right's social media habits.

She has also written for publications such as Public Culture and New Media and Society.

== Awards and honors ==
She is a 2020 Andrew Carnegie Fellowship Award Recipient which is an award that provides support to top researchers in humanities. She was honored in 2017, as a 2017 Global Thinker from Foreign Policy Magazine for her work on examining the social aspects of fake news.

== See also ==
- Context collapse
