= Calculating Visions =

1992 book by Mark Stern

- Author: Mark Stern
- Language: English
- Publisher: Rutgers University Press
- Publication date: February 1, 1992
- Publication place: United States
- ISBN: 9780813517445

Calculating Visions: Kennedy, Johnson, and Civil Rights is a book by Mark Stern, published in 1992 by Rutgers University Press.

It is a commentary and evaluation of methods and techniques used by former Presidents John F. Kennedy and Lyndon B. Johnson in their support of Civil Rights.

The author, Mark Stern, is a professor of Political Science at University of Central Florida, and has written multiple essays, short critiques and articles about the subject of the book. The book presents the idea that both Kennedy and Johnson were not very emotionally committed to the area and movement, although Johnson seems to have been more so than Kennedy, according to the book. This is demonstrated as the norm in politics, as most politicians, according to Stern, use crises and movements to advance their political stature and gain votes: "Candidates need policy proposals in order to gain votes".
