= Altercasting =

Altercasting is a theory created by Eugene Weinstein and Paul Deutschberger in 1963. The theory relies on the concept of persuasion. The goal of altercasting is to project an identity onto another person in order to meet one's own goals. Because of the flexibility of altercasting, it is used frequently in advertising and health promotion. Altercasting functions to increase the likelihood of a person performing in line with a specific social role.

== Assumptions and key differences ==
People can be persuaded by altercasting because it targets both the social role and ego of a person, which are two of the most crucial and fundamental elements of day-to-day life. Furthermore, altercasting can be positive or negative and still stimulate similar effects.

Altercasting can be broken into two sub groups: manded altercasting and tact altercasting.

Manded altercasting is when a new or existing role is made more prominent and told directly to people.

Examples: "You as a broadcast major should..."

"You look to me as someone who values humility..."

Tact altercasting is a more passive way in forcing people to accept certain roles. This is when people tend to act in certain ways that could trigger others to take a specific role.

Examples: When someone tends to be needy, another person is forced to be generous and caring.

When a group of children is in chaos, one of them is forced to assume the role of a leader.

== Dimensions ==
There are six processes that can be combined to create a successful altercasting, under both subgroups. The ego in each tactic is the individual induced into manipulation, while the alter is the idea/role one wants to enforce.

1. Structural Distance: the physical proximity of the Alter idea in regard to the Ego. For the majority of individuals, a closer distance will promote more alter influence.
2. Evaluative Distance: the more authoritative qualities or dominance an Alter has; the easier it is to exert influence over the Ego.
3. Emotional Distance: the Alter casts into a role in which the role is presumed to be involved with an Ego's feelings, needs, and everyday concerns. This plays deep into the psychological nature of the mind.
4. Support vs Support Seeking: there are two cases here, either that the Alter is in an identity requiring Ego's help or assistance or, at the other extreme, being required to give aid and comfort to Ego. In the former, manipulation into a certain role is more common. Self-presentation and altercasting clearly merge on this dimension.
5. Interdependence vs Autonomy: the extent to which Ego projects Alter as being tied to him by bonds of common fate, perspective, or concurrence of interests.
6. Degree of Freedom Allowed Alter: the range of behavior Ego allows Alter within the encounter. Each action is ultimately directed at narrowing Alter's choice of responses so as to increase the probability of eliciting the task response.

== Impact on society ==
Altercasting messages are important to study, not only because they are prevalent in our society, but also because altercasting messages rely on the social psychological construct of social roles. With a free market people are pummeled with advertising daily; not all altercasting messages are driven this way, but a vast majority are used as advertising. As a society, people are exposed to as many as 5,000 advertisements a day. By no means are all of these directly connected to altercasting, yet a majority of advertisers are using sneaky tactics to sell products. For example, advertisers might say a 35-year-old woman should care about being a good mother, and that a good mother has a big enough vehicle to drive her children and their friends around after soccer practice. Therefore, she should buy the newest van coming out.

People identify themselves by what they buy, if they are manipulated into buying products—the way they see themselves can leave lasting impacts if they notice what is happening.

== Impact on the mind ==
The mind fills in the roles that people play by many factors, but especially by the products that they own. Behavior is subjective and case-by-case; the reasoning behind why we do something is still being developed. However, altercasting has been shown to have massive effects on behavior change. If behavior is changing, a link to psychological disorders like schizophrenia or dissociative identity disorder could be one piece of the base explanation for these mental illnesses.

Altercasting is a subgroup to the role theory. Some roles are naturally absorbed into a person's identity, while others are influenced and pressured to arise. The manipulation factor is contributed through altercasting. With altercasting, the manipulations of factors (positive and negative) must be present for certain roles to occur. Once accepted by individuals, roles exert a variety of social pressures on them to make certain that the roles are carried out. People must act in accordance with the roles to maintain a positive image and sustain the interaction. Accordingly, altercasting may function by capitalizing on a person's reliance on general social roles as a means to gain compliance.
