= Persuasion =

Umbrella term of influence and mode of communication

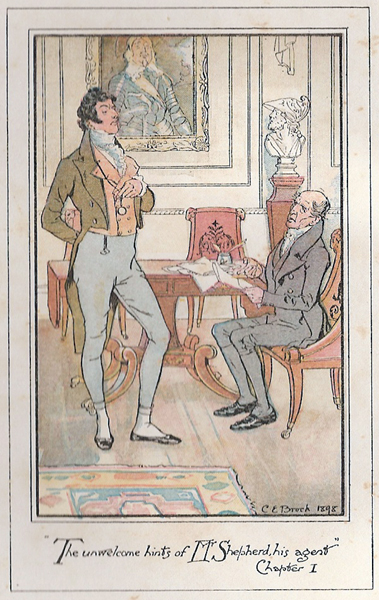
Persuasion, novel by Jane Austen, illustrated by C. E. Brock. For Sir Walter Elliot, baronet, the hints of Mr Shepherd, his agent, were quite unwelcome...

Persuasion is the act of influencing a person's beliefs, attitudes, intentions, motivations, or behavior. Research on persuasion and its affects is of interest to many fields, and is a frequent topic in the specialty of social psychology. Persuasion usually affects the decision making of an individual, and it is aimed at a variety of groups, including consumers, voters, and others.

== Forms ==
Propaganda is a form of persuasion used to indoctrinate a population towards an individual or a particular agenda. Coercion is a form of persuasion that uses aggressive threats and the provocation of fear and/or shame to influence a person's behavior. Systematic persuasion is the process through which attitudes or beliefs are influenced by appeals to logic and reason. Heuristic persuasion, on the other hand, is the process through which attitudes or beliefs are leveraged by appeals to habit or emotion.

=== Research interests ===
Persuasion is studied in many disciplines. Rhetoric studies modes of persuasion in speech and writing and is often taught as a classical subject. Psychology looks at persuasion through the lens of individual behavior and neuroscience studies the brain activity associated with this behavior. History and political science are interested in the role of propaganda in shaping historical events. In business, persuasion is aimed at influencing a person's (or group's) attitude or behavior towards some event, idea, object, or another person by using written, spoken, or visual methods to convey information, feelings, or reasoning, or a combination thereof. Persuasion is also often used to pursue personal gain, such as election campaigning, giving a sales pitch, or in trial advocacy. Persuasion can also be interpreted as using personal or positional resources to change people.

== History and philosophy ==
The academic study of persuasion began with the Greeks, who emphasized rhetoric and elocution as the highest standard for a successful politician. All trials were held in front of the Assembly, and the likelihood of success of the prosecution versus the defense rested on the persuasiveness of the speaker. Rhetoric is the art of effective persuasive speaking, often through the use of figures of speech, metaphors, and other techniques.

The Greek philosopher Aristotle listed four reasons why one should learn the art of persuasion:

1. Truth and justice are perfect; thus if a case loses, it is the fault of the speaker.
2. It is an excellent tool for teaching.
3. A good rhetorician must be able to argue both sides to understand the whole problem, and
4. There is no better way to defend one's self.

He described three fundamental ways to communicate persuasively:

1. Ethos (credibility): refers to the effort to convince the audience of one's credibility or character. It is not automatic and can be created through actions, deeds, understanding, or expertise by the speaker.
2. Logos (reason): refers to the effort to convince the audience by using logic and reason. This can be formal and non-formal. Formal reasoning uses syllogisms, arguments where two statements validly imply a third statement. Non-formal reasoning uses enthymemes, arguments that have valid reasoning but are informal and assume the audience has prior knowledge.
3. Pathos (emotion): refers to the effort to persuade the audience by making an appeal to their feelings.

=== Ethics of persuasion ===
Many philosophers have commented on the morality of persuasion. Socrates argued that rhetoric was based on appearances rather than the essence of a matter. Thomas Hobbes was critical of using rhetoric to create controversy, particularly the use of metaphor. Immanuel Kant was critical of rhetoric, arguing that it could cause people to reach conclusions that are at odds with those that they would have reached if they had applied their full judgment. He draws parallels between the function of rhetoric and the deterministic function of the mind like a machine.

Aristotle was critical of persuasion, though argued that judges would often allow themselves to be persuaded by choosing to apply emotions rather than reason. However, he argued that persuasion could be used to induce an individual to apply reason and judgment.

Writers such as William Keith and Christian O. Lundberg argue that uses of force and threats in trying to influence others does not lead to persuasion, but rather talking to people does, going further to add "While Rhetoric certainly has its dark side that deals in tricks and perceptions... the systematic study of rhetoric generally ignores these techniques, in part because they are not very systematic or reliable." There is also in legal disputes, the matter of the burden of proof when bringing up an argument, where it often falls on the hands of the one presenting a case to prove its validity to another person and where presumptions may be made where of the burden of proof has not been met, an argument may be dropped such as in a more famous example of "Innocent until proven guilty", although this line of presumption or burden of proof may not always be followed. While Keith and Lundberg do go into detail about the different intricacies of persuasion, they do explain that lapses in logic and or reasoning could lead to persuasive arguments with faults. These faults can come as enthymemes, where more likely than not only certain audiences with specific pieces of knowledge may understand the reasoning being presented with missing logic, or the more egregious example of fallacies where conclusions may be drawn (almost always incorrectly) through invalid argument. In contrast to the reasoning behind enthymemes, the use of examples can help prove a person's rhetorical claims through inductive reasoning, which assumes that "if something is true in specific cases, it is true in general".

Examples can be split into two categories real and hypothetical. Real examples come from personal experience or academic/scientific research which can support the argument a person is making. Hypothetical examples are made-up. When arguing something, speakers can put forward a hypothetical situation that illustrates the point they are making to connect better with the audience. These examples must be plausible to properly illustrate a persuasive argument.

== Theories ==
There are many psychological theories about what influences an individual's behavior in different situations. These theories have implications for how persuasion works.

=== Attribution theory ===
Humans attempt to explain the actions of others through either dispositional attribution or situational attribution.

Dispositional attribution, also referred to as internal attribution, attempts to point to a person's traits, abilities, motives, or dispositions as a cause or explanation for their actions. A citizen criticizing a president by saying the nation is lacking economic progress and health because the president is either lazy or lacking in economic intuition is utilizing a dispositional attribution.

Situational attribution, also referred to as external attribution, attempts to point to the context around the person and factors of his surroundings, particularly things that are completely out of his control. A citizen claiming that a lack of economic progress is not a fault of the president but rather the fact that he inherited a poor economy from the previous president is situational attribution.

A fundamental attribution error occurs when people wrongly attribute either a shortcoming or accomplishment to internal factors while disregarding all external factors. In general, people use dispositional attribution more often than situational attribution when trying to explain or understand the behavior of others. This happens because we focus more on the individual when we lack information about that individual's situation and context. When trying to persuade others to like us or another person, we tend to explain positive behaviors and accomplishments with dispositional attribution and negative behaviors and shortcomings with situational attributions.

=== Behavior change theories ===
The Theory of Planned Behavior is the foremost theory of behavior change. It has support from meta-analyses which reveals it can predict around 30% of behavior. Theories, by nature however, prioritize internal validity, over external validity. They are coherent and therefore make for an easily reappropriated story. On the other hand, they will correspond more poorly with the evidence, and mechanics of reality, than a straightforward itemization of the behavior change interventions (techniques) by their individual efficacy. These behavior change interventions have been categorized by behavioral scientists.

=== Conditioning theories ===
Conditioning plays a huge part in the concept of persuasion. It is more often about leading someone into taking certain actions of their own, rather than giving direct commands. In advertisements for example, this is done by attempting to connect a positive emotion to a brand/product logo. This is often done by creating commercials that make people laugh, using a sexual undertone, inserting uplifting images and/or music etc. and then ending the commercial with a brand/product logo. Great examples of this are professional athletes. They are paid to connect themselves to things that can be directly related to their roles; sport shoes, tennis rackets, golf balls, or completely irrelevant things like soft drinks, popcorn poppers and panty hose. The important thing for the advertiser is to establish a connection to the consumer.

This conditioning is thought to affect how people view certain products, knowing that most purchases are made on the basis of emotion. By recalling a memory from a certain smell or sound, the objective of some ads is solely to bring back certain emotions when one sees their logo. The hope is that repeating the message several times makes consumers more likely to purchase the product because they already connect it with a good emotion and positive experience. Stefano DellaVigna and Matthew Gentzkow did a comprehensive study on the effects of persuasion in different domains. They discovered that persuasion has little or no effect on advertisement; however, there was a substantial effect of persuasion on voting if there was face-to-face contact.

=== Cognitive dissonance theory ===
Leon Festinger originally proposed the theory of cognitive dissonance in 1957. He theorized that human beings constantly strive for mental consistency. Our cognition (thoughts, beliefs, or attitudes) can be in agreement, unrelated, or in disagreement with each other. Our cognition can also be in agreement or disagreement with our behaviors. When we detect conflicting cognition, or dissonance, it gives us a sense of incompleteness and discomfort. For example, a person who is addicted to smoking cigarettes but also suspects it could be detrimental to their health suffers from cognitive dissonance.

Festinger suggests that we are motivated to reduce this dissonance until our cognition is in harmony with itself. We strive for mental consistency. There are four main ways we go about reducing or eliminating our dissonance:

1. changing our minds about one of the facets of cognition
2. reducing the importance of a cognition
3. increasing the overlap between the two, and
4. re-evaluating the cost/reward ratio.

Revisiting the example of the smoker, they can either quit smoking, reduce the importance of their health, convince themself they are not at risk, or decide that the reward of smoking is worth the cost of their health.

Cognitive dissonance is powerful when it relates to competition and self-concept. The most famous example of how cognitive dissonance can be used for persuasion comes from Festinger and Carlsmith's 1959 experiment in which participants were asked to complete a very dull task for an hour. Some were paid $20, while others were paid $1, and afterwards they were instructed to tell the next waiting participants that the experiment was fun and exciting. Those who were paid $1 were much more likely to convince the next participants that the experiment really was enjoyable than those who received $20. This is because $20 is enough reason to participate in a dull task for an hour, so there is no dissonance. Those who received $1 experienced great dissonance, so they had to truly convince themselves that the task actually was enjoyable to avoid feeling taken advantage of, and therefore reduce their dissonance.

=== Elaboration likelihood model ===
Persuasion has traditionally been associated with two routes:

- Central route: Whereby an individual evaluates information presented to them based on the pros and cons of it and how well it supports their values
- Peripheral route: Change is mediated by how attractive the source of communication is and by bypassing the deliberation process.

The Elaboration likelihood model (ELM) forms a new facet of the route theory. It holds that the probability of effective persuasion depends on how successful the communication is at bringing to mind a relevant mental representation, which is the elaboration likelihood. Thus if the target of the communication is personally relevant, this increases the elaboration likelihood of the intended outcome and would be more persuasive if it were through the central route. Communication which does not require careful thought would be better suited to the peripheral route.

=== Functional theories ===
Functional theorists attempt to understand the divergent attitudes individuals have towards people, objects or issues in different situations. There are four main functional attitudes:

1. Adjustment function: A main motivation for individuals is to increase positive external rewards and minimize the costs. Attitudes serve to direct behavior towards the rewards and away from punishment.
2. Ego Defensive function: The process by which an individual protects their ego from being threatened by their own negative impulses or threatening thoughts.
3. Value-expressive: When an individual derives pleasure from presenting an image of themselves which is in line with their self-concept and the beliefs that they want to be associated with.
4. Knowledge function: The need to attain a sense of understanding and control over one's life. An individual's attitudes therefore serve to help set standards and rules which govern their sense of being.

When communication targets an underlying function, its degree of persuasiveness influences whether individuals change their attitude after determining that another attitude would more effectively fulfill that function.

=== Inoculation theory ===
A vaccine introduces a weak form of a virus that can easily be defeated to prepare the immune system should it need to fight off a stronger form of the same virus. In much the same way, the theory of inoculation suggests that a certain party can introduce a weak form of an argument that is easily thwarted in order to make the audience inclined to disregard a stronger, full-fledged form of that argument from an opposing party.

This often occurs in negative advertisements and comparative advertisements—both for products and political causes. An example would be a manufacturer of a product displaying an ad that refutes one particular claim made about a rival's product, so that when the audience sees an ad for said rival product, they refute the product claims automatically.

=== Narrative transportation theory ===
Narrative transportation theory proposes that when people lose themselves in a story, their attitudes and intentions change to reflect that story. The mental state of narrative transportation can explain the persuasive effect of stories on people, who may experience narrative transportation when certain contextual and personal preconditions are met, as Green and Brock postulate for the transportation-imagery model. Narrative transportation occurs whenever the story receiver experiences a feeling of entering a world evoked by the narrative because of empathy for the story characters and imagination of the story plot.

== Methods ==
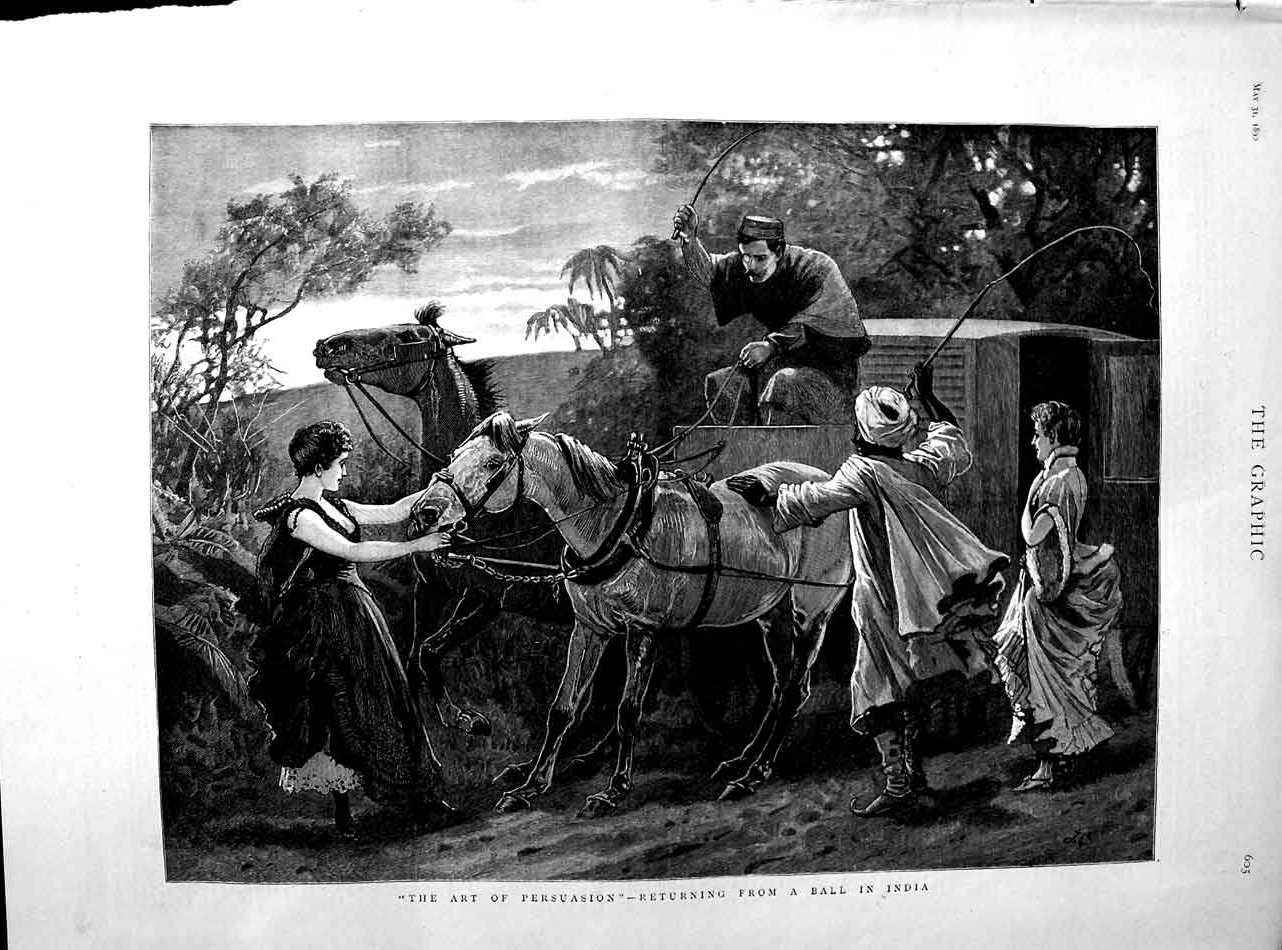
'The art of persuasion'— returning from a ball in India from "The Graphic", 1890

Persuasion methods are also sometimes referred to as persuasion tactics or persuasion strategies.

=== Use of force ===
There is the use of force in persuasion, which does not have any scientific theories, except for its use to make demands. The use of force is then a precedent to the failure of less direct means of persuasion. Application of this strategy can be interpreted as a threat since the persuader does not give options to their request.

=== Cialdini's influence cues ===
Robert Cialdini, in Influence: Science and Practice, his 2001 publication on persuasion, identified six "influence cues or weapons of influence":

Reciprocity

The principle of reciprocity states that when a person provides us with something, we attempt to repay them in kind. Reciprocation produces a sense of obligation, which can be a powerful tool in persuasion. The reciprocity rule is effective because it can be overpowering and instill in us a sense of obligation. Generally, we have a dislike for individuals who neglect to return a favor or provide payment when offered a free service or gift. As a result, reciprocation is a widely held principle. This societal standard makes reciprocity extremely powerful persuasive technique, as it can result in unequal exchanges and can even apply to an uninvited first favor. Reciprocity applies to the marketing field because of its use as a powerful persuasive technique. The marketing tactic of "free samples" demonstrates the reciprocity rule because of the sense of obligation that the rule produces. This sense of obligation comes from the desire to repay the marketer for the gift of a "free sample".

Consistency

Consistency is an important aspect of persuasion because it:

1. is highly valued by society,
2. results in a beneficial approach to daily life, and
3. provides a valuable shortcut through the complicated nature of modern existence.

Consistency allows us to more effectively make decisions and process information. The concept of consistency states that someone who commits to something, orally or in writing, is more likely to honor that commitment. This is especially true for written commitments, as they appear psychologically more concrete and can create hard proof. Someone who commits to a stance tends to behave according to that commitment. Commitment is an effective persuasive technique, because once someone is committed to something, they are more likely to engage in self-persuasion, providing themselves and others with reasons and justifications to support their commitment in order to avoid dissonance. Cialdini notes Chinese brainwashing of American prisoners of war in Korean War to rewrite their self-image and gain automatic unenforced compliance. Another example is children being made to repeat the Pledge of Allegiance each morning and why marketers have people close popups by saying "I'll sign up later" or "No thanks, I prefer not making money".

Social proof

Social learning, also known as social proof, is a core principle among almost all forms of persuasion. It is based on the idea of peer influence, and is considered essential for audience-centered approaches to persuasive messages. The principle of social proof suggests what people believe or do is typically learned by observing the norms of those around us. People naturally conform their actions and beliefs to fit what society expects, as the rewards for doing so are usually greater than standing out.

"The power of the crowd" is thought to be highly involved in the decisions we make. Social proof is often utilized by people in a situation that requires a decision be made. In uncertain or ambiguous situations, when multiple possibilities create choices we must make, people are likely to conform to what others do. We take cues from those around us as to what the appropriate behavior is in that moment. People often feel they will make fewer mistakes "by acting in accord with social evidence than by behaving contrary to it."

Liking

This principle is simple and concise. People say "yes" to people that they like. Two major factors contribute to overall likeness. The first is physical attractiveness. People who are physically attractive seem more persuasive. They get what they want and they can easily change others' attitudes. This attractiveness is proven to send favorable messages/impressions of other traits that a person may have, such as talent, kindness, and intelligence. The second factor is similarity. People are more easily persuaded by others they deem as similar to themselves.

Authority

People are more prone to believing those with authority. They have the tendency to believe that if an expert says something, it must be true. People are more likely to adhere to opinions of individuals who are knowledgeable and trustworthy. Although a message often stands or falls on the weight of its ideas and arguments, a person's attributes or implied authority can have a large effect on the success of their message.

In The True Believer, Eric Hoffer noted, "People whose lives are barren and insecure seem to show a greater willingness to obey than people who are self-sufficient and self-confident. To the frustrated, freedom from responsibility is more attractive than freedom from restraint. . . . They willingly abdicate the directing of their lives to those who want to plan, command and shoulder all responsibility."

In the Milgram study, a series of experiments begun in 1961, a "teacher" and a "learner" were placed in two different rooms. The "learner" was attached to an electric harness that could administer shock. The "teacher" was told by a supervisor, dressed in a white scientist's coat, to ask the learner questions and punish him when he got a question wrong. The teacher was instructed by the study supervisor to deliver an electric shock from a panel under the teacher's control. After delivery, the teacher had to up the voltage to the next notch. The voltage went up to 450 volts. The catch to this experiment was that the teacher did not know that the learner was an actor faking the pain sounds he heard and was not actually being harmed. The experiment was being done to see how obedient we are to authority. "When an authority tells ordinary people it is their job to deliver harm, how much suffering will each subject be willing to inflict on an entirely innocent other person if the instructions come 'from above'?." In this study, the results showed that the teachers were willing to give as much pain as was available to them. The conclusion was that people are willing to bring pain upon others when they are directed to do so by some authority figure.

Scarcity

Scarcity can play an important role in the process of persuasion. When something has limited availability, people assign it more value. As one of the six basic principles behind the science of persuasion, then, "scarcity" can be leveraged to convince people to buy into some suggestions, heed the advice or accept the business proposals. According to Robert Cialdini, Regents' Professor of Psychology and Marketing at Arizona State University and Distinguished Professor of Marketing in the W. P. Carey School, whatever is rare, uncommon or dwindling in availability – this idea of scarcity – confers value on objects, or even relationships.

There are two major reasons why the scarcity principle works:

- When things are difficult to get, they are usually more valuable, so that can make it seem to have better quality.
- When things become less available, we could lose the chance to acquire them.

When this happens, people usually assign the scarce item or service more value simply because it is harder to acquire. This principle is that everyone wants things that are out of their reach. Something easily available is not that desirable as something very rare.

Later, Cialdini added a seventh principle or cue, "unity", referring to a shared identity which embraces both the influencer and influencee.

=== Persuasive technology ===
Persuasive technology is broadly defined as technology that is designed to change attitudes or behaviors of the users through persuasion and social influence, but not necessarily through coercion. Such technologies are regularly used in sales, diplomacy, politics, religion, military training, public health, and management, and may potentially be used in any area of human-human or human-computer interaction.

Most self-identified persuasive technology research focuses on interactive, computational technologies, including desktop computers, Internet services, video games, and mobile devices, but this incorporates and builds on the results, theories, and methods of experimental psychology, rhetoric, and human-computer interaction. The design of persuasive technologies can be seen as a particular case of design with intent, in which technological features are deliberately designed to influence users' attitudes or behaviours.

== In culture ==
It is through a basic cultural personal definition of persuasion that everyday people understand how others are attempting to influence them and then how they influence others. The dialogue surrounding persuasion is constantly evolving because of the necessity to use persuasion in everyday life. Persuasion tactics traded in society have influences from researchers, which may sometimes be misinterpreted. To keep evolutionary advantage, in the sense of wealth and survival, one must persuade and not be persuaded. To understand cultural persuasion, researchers gather knowledge from domains such as "buying, selling, advertising, and shopping, as well as parenting and courting."

Methods of persuasion vary by culture, both in prevalence and effectiveness. For example, advertisements tend to appeal to different values according to whether they are used in collectivistic or individualistic cultures.

=== Persuasion Knowledge Model (PKM) ===
The Persuasion Knowledge Model (PKM) was created by Friestad and Wright in 1994. This framework allows the researchers to analyze the process of gaining and using everyday persuasion knowledge. The researchers suggest the necessity of including "the relationship and interplay between everyday folk knowledge and scientific knowledge on persuasion, advertising, selling, and marketing in general."

To educate the general population about research findings and new knowledge about persuasion, a teacher must draw on their pre-existing beliefs from folk persuasion to make the research relevant and informative to lay people, which creates "mingling of their scientific insights and commonsense beliefs."

As a result of this constant mingling, the issue of persuasion expertise becomes messy. Expertise status can be interpreted from a variety of sources like job titles, celebrity, or published scholarship.

It is through this multimodal process that we create concepts such as, "Stay away from car salesmen, they will try to trick you." The kind of persuasion techniques employed by car salesmen creates an large distrust of them in popular culture. According to Psychology Today, they employ tactics ranging from making personal life ties with the customer to altering reality by handing the customer the new car keys before the purchase.

Campbell proposed and empirically demonstrated that some persuasive advertising approaches lead consumers to infer manipulative intent on the marketer's part. Once consumers infer manipulative intent, they are less persuaded by the marketer, as indicated by attenuated advertising attitudes, brand attitudes and purchase intentions. Campbell and Kirmani developed an explicit model of the conditions under which consumers use persuasion knowledge in evaluating influence agents such as salespersons.

== Neurobiology ==
An article showed that EEG measures of anterior prefrontal asymmetry might be a predictor of persuasion. Research participants were presented with arguments that favored and arguments that opposed the attitudes they already held. Those whose brain was more active in left prefrontal areas said that they paid the most attention to statements with which they agreed while those with a more active right prefrontal area said that they paid attention to statements that disagreed. This is an example of defensive repression, the avoidance or forgetting of unpleasant information. Research has shown that the trait of defensive repression is related to relative left prefrontal activation. In addition, when pleasant or unpleasant words, probably analogous to agreement or disagreement, were seen incidental to the main task, an fMRI scan showed preferential left prefrontal activation to the pleasant words.

One way therefore to increase persuasion would seem to be to selectively activate the right prefrontal cortex. This is easily done by monaural stimulation to the contralateral ear. The effect apparently depends on selective attention rather than merely the source of stimulation. This manipulation had the expected outcome: more persuasion for messages coming from the left.

== See also ==
- Bayesian persuasion
- Captatio benevolentiae
- Compliance gaining
- Judge–advisor system
- Perception management
- Regulatory focus theory
- Sleeper effect
- Social marketing
