= The Presentation of Self in Everyday Life =

1956 book by Erving Goffman

- Book cover
- Authors: Erving Goffman
- Language: English
- Subjects: Social anthropology Sociology; Social psychology
- Publisher: Doubleday
- Publication date: 1956 (Scotland); 1959 (U.S.)
- Publication place: Scotland
- Media type: Print (hardcover and paperback)
- Pages: 251
- Awards: American Sociological Association’s MacIver Award (1961)
- ISBN: 978-0-14-013571-8
- OCLC: 59624504

The Presentation of Self in Everyday Life is a 1956 sociological book by Erving Goffman, in which the author uses the imagery of theatre to portray the importance of human social interaction. This approach became known as Goffman's dramaturgical analysis, and also introduced the concept of impression management.

Originally published in Scotland in 1956 and in the United States in 1959, it is Goffman's first and most famous book, for which he received the American Sociological Association's MacIver award in 1961. In 1998, the International Sociological Association listed the work as the tenth most important sociological book of the 20th century.

== Background and summary ==
The Presentation of Self in Everyday Life was the first book to treat face-to-face interaction as a subject of sociological study. Goffman treats it as a kind of report in which he frames out the theatrical performance that applies to these interactions. He believes that when an individual comes in contact with other people, that individual will attempt to control or guide the impression that others might make of him by changing or fixing his or her setting, appearance, and manner. At the same time, the person the individual is interacting with is trying to form and obtain information about the individual.

Believing that all participants in social interactions are engaged in practices to avoid being embarrassed or embarrassing others, Goffman developed his dramaturgical analysis, wherein he observes a connection between the kinds of acts that people put on in their daily life and theatrical performances.

In social interaction, as in theatrical performance, there is a front region where the performers (individuals) are on stage in front of the audiences. This is where the positive aspect of the idea of self and desired impressions are highlighted. There is also a back region, where individuals can prepare for or set aside their role. The "front" or performance that an actor plays out includes "manner," or how the role is carried out, and "appearance" including the dress and look of the performer. Additionally, “front” also includes the “setting”, which means the environment of performance. It can be a furniture, physical layout or the stage props. Often, performers work together in "teams" and form bonds of collegiality based on their common commitment to the performance they are mutually engaged in.

The core of Goffman's analysis lies in this relationship between performance and life. Unlike other writers who have used this metaphor, Goffman seems to take all elements of acting into consideration: an actor performs on a setting which is constructed of a stage and a backstage; the props in both settings direct his action; he is being watched by an audience, but at the same time he may be an audience for his viewers' play.

According to Goffman, the social actor in many areas of life will take on an already established role, with pre-existing front and props as well as the costume he would wear in front of a specific audience. The actor's main goal is to keep coherent and adjust to the different settings offered him. This is done mainly through interaction with other actors. To a certain extent this imagery bridges structure and agency enabling each while saying that structure and agency can limit each other.

=== Translated titles ===
Since the metaphor of a theatre is the leading theme of the book, the German and consequently also the Czech translation used a fitting summary as the name of the book We All Play-Act (German: Wir Alle Spielen Theater; Czech: Všichni hrajeme divadlo), apart from the names in other languages that usually translate the title literally. Another translation, which also builds on the leading theatrical theme, rather than the original title, is the Swedish title of the book Jaget och Maskerna (The Self and the Masks). The French title is La Mise en scène de la vie quotidienne (The Staging of Everyday Life). Similarly, in the Polish language the book is known as Człowiek w teatrze życia codziennego (The Human in the Theatre of Everyday Life).

== Concepts ==
=== Definition of the situation ===
A major theme that Goffman treats throughout the work is the fundamental importance of having an agreed upon definition of the situation in a given interaction, which serves to give the interaction coherency. In interactions or performances the involved parties may be audience members and performers simultaneously; the actors usually foster impressions that reflect well upon themselves and encourage the others, by various means, to accept their preferred definition. Goffman acknowledges that when the accepted definition of the situation has been discredited, some or all of the actors may pretend that nothing has changed, provided that they find this strategy profitable to themselves or wish to keep the peace. For example, when a person attending a formal dinner—and who is certainly striving to present himself or herself positively—trips, nearby party-goers may pretend not to have seen the fumble; they assist the person in maintaining face. Goffman avers that this type of artificial, willed credulity happens on every level of social organization, from top to bottom.

=== Idealization and expressive control ===
Goffman expands on the theatrical metaphor by noting that performers do not merely play a role, but attempt to embody the idealized moral values of their community. Through a process he calls "idealization," actors conceal the messy, degrading, or profitable work required to construct the performance, presenting only the polished final product. Because audiences are highly observant, maintaining this illusion requires strict "expressive control." A single "unmeant gesture"—such as a yawn, a slip of the tongue, or a momentary loss of poise—can discredit the actor's persona and destroy the shared definition of the situation.

=== Discrepant roles ===
While dramaturgical analysis often assumes a simple binary between performers and audience members, Goffman dedicated significant attention to individuals who blur these boundaries and hold access to destructive secrets. He categorized several "discrepant roles," including the "informer" (who gains backstage access and betrays the team's secrets to the audience), the "shill" (who poses as an audience member but is secretly allied with the performers to guide crowd reactions), and the "non-person" (such as a servant, janitor, or technician, who is treated as if they are not present, allowing them to witness both the front and back stage without disrupting the performance).

=== Communication out of character ===
When actors are in the back region and shielded from the audience, they engage in "communication out of character" to build team solidarity and release the tension of the performance. Goffman outlined backstage behaviors such as "derogating the audience" (mocking or criticizing the audience to reinforce the team's internal bond) and "staging talk" (gossiping about past performances or strategizing for future ones).

=== Self-presentation theory ===
The book proposes a theory of self that has become known as self-presentation theory, which suggests that people have the desire to control the impressions that other people form about them.

The concept is still used by researchers in social media today, including Kaplan and Haenlein's Users of the World Unite (2010), Russell W. Belk's "Extended Self in a Digital World" (2013), and Nell Haynes' Social Media in Northern Chile: Posting the Extraordinarily Ordinary (2016).

== Reception ==
In 1961, Goffman received the American Sociological Association's MacIver award for The Presentation of Self in Everyday Life.

In 1983, philosopher Helmut R. Wagner called the book "by far" Goffman's best book and "a still unsurpassed study of the management of impressions in face-to-face encounters, a form of not uncommon manipulation."

In 1998, the International Sociological Association listed The Presentation of Self in Everyday Life as the tenth most important sociological book of the twentieth century, behind Talcott Parsons' The Structure of Social Action (1937).
