= Neuroecology =

Neuroecology studies ways in which the structure and function of the brain results from adaptations to a specific habitat and niche.

It integrates the multiple disciplines of neuroscience, which examines the biological basis of cognitive and emotional processes, such as perception, memory, and decision-making, with the field of ecology, which studies the relationship between living organisms and their physical environment.

In biology, the term 'adaptation' signifies the way evolutionary processes enhance an organism's fitness to survive within a specific ecological context. This fitness includes the development of physical, cognitive, and emotional adaptations specifically suited to the environmental conditions in which the organism or phenotype lives, and in which its species or genotype evolves.

Neuroecology concentrates specifically on neurological adaptations, particularly those of the brain. The purview of this study encompasses two areas. Firstly, neuroecology studies how the physical structure and functional activity of neural networks in a phenotype is influenced by characteristics of the environmental context. This includes the way social stressors, interpersonal relationships, and physical conditions precipitate persistent alterations in the individual brain, providing the neural correlates of cognitive and emotional responses. Secondly, neuroecology studies how neural structure and activity common to a genotype is determined by natural selection of traits that benefit survival and reproduction in a specific environment.

== See also ==
- Evolutionary ecology
- Evolutionary psychology
