= Identity (social science) =

Qualities, beliefs, personality, looks and/or expressions that distinguish a person

Identity is the set of qualities, beliefs, personality traits, appearance, or expressions that characterize a person or a group.

Identity emerges during childhood as children start to comprehend their self-concept, and it remains a consistent aspect throughout different stages of life. Identity is shaped by social and cultural factors and how others perceive and acknowledge one's characteristics. The etymology of the term "identity" from the Latin noun identitas emphasizes an individual's "sameness with others". Identity encompasses various aspects such as occupational, religious, national, ethnic or racial, gender/sex, gender identity, generational, and political identities, among others, such as height, weight, name, etc. This reveals the polysemous nature of the word - the "sameness" of identity can be both objective or subjective, depending on the referent to which one is claiming or inhabiting "sameness", which can lead to confusion. For example, identifiable gender is objective and gender identity subjective.

Identity serves multiple functions, acting as a "self-regulatory structure" that provides meaning, direction, and a sense of self-control. It fosters internal harmony and serves as a behavioral compass, enabling individuals to orient themselves towards the future and establish long-term goals. As an active process, it profoundly influences an individual's capacity to adapt to life events and achieve a state of well-being. However, identity originates from traits or attributes that individuals may have little or no control over, such as their family background or ethnicity.

In sociology, emphasis is placed by sociologists on collective identity, in which an individual's identity is strongly associated with role-behavior or the collection of group memberships that define them. According to Peter Burke, "Identities tell us who we are and they announce to others who we are." Identities subsequently guide behavior, leading "fathers" to behave like "fathers" and "nurses" to act like "nurses".

In psychology, the term "identity" is most commonly used to describe personal identity, or the distinctive qualities or traits that make an individual unique. Identities are strongly associated with self-concept, self-image (one's mental model of oneself), self-esteem, and individuality. Individuals' identities are situated, but also contextual, situationally adaptive and changing. Despite their fluid character, identities often feel as if they are stable ubiquitous categories defining an individual, because of their grounding in the sense of personal identity (the sense of being a continuous and persistent self).

== Usage ==
Mark Mazower noted in 1998: "At some point in the 1970s this term ["identity"] was borrowed from social psychology and applied with abandon to societies, nations and groups." In time, some communities have come to equate an identity with an illness.

== In psychology ==
Erik Erikson (1902–94) became one of the earliest psychologists to take an explicit interest in identity. An essential feature of Erikson's theory of psychosocial development was the idea of the ego identity (often referred to as the self), which is described as an individual's personal sense of continuity. He suggested that people can attain this feeling throughout their lives as they develop and is meant to be an ongoing process. The ego-identity consists of two main features: one's personal characteristics and development, and the culmination of social and cultural factors and roles that impact one's identity. In Erikson's theory, he describes eight distinct stages across the lifespan that are each characterized by a conflict between the inner, personal world and the outer, social world of an individual. Erikson identified the conflict of identity as occurring primarily during adolescence and described potential outcomes that depend on how one deals with this conflict. Those who do not manage a resynthesis of childhood identifications are seen as being in a state of 'identity diffusion' whereas those who retain their given identities unquestioned have 'foreclosed' identities. On some readings of Erikson, the development of a strong ego identity, along with the proper integration into a stable society and culture, lead to a stronger sense of identity in general. Accordingly, a deficiency in either of these factors may increase the chance of an identity crisis or confusion.

The "Neo-Eriksonian" identity status paradigm emerged in 1966, driven largely by the work of James Marcia. This model focuses on the concepts of exploration and commitment. The central idea is that an individual's sense of identity is determined in large part by the degrees to which a person has made certain explorations and the extent to which they have commitments to those explorations or a particular identity. A person may display either relative weakness or strength in terms of both exploration and commitments. When assigned categories, there were four possible results: identity diffusion, identity foreclosure, identity moratorium, and identity achievement. Diffusion is when a person avoids or refuses both exploration and making a commitment. Foreclosure occurs when a person does make a commitment to a particular identity but neglected to explore other options. Identity moratorium is when a person avoids or postpones making a commitment but is still actively exploring their options and different identities. Lastly, identity achievement is when a person has both explored many possibilities and has committed to their identity.

Although the self is distinct from identity, the literature of self-psychology can offer some insight into how identity is maintained. From the vantage point of self-psychology, there are two areas of interest: the processes by which a self is formed (the "I"), and the actual content of the schemata which compose the self-concept (the "Me"). In the latter field, theorists have shown interest in relating the self-concept to self-esteem, the differences between complex and simple ways of organizing self-knowledge, and the links between those organizing principles and the processing of information.

Weinreich's identity variant similarly includes the categories of identity diffusion, foreclosure and crisis, but with a somewhat different emphasis. Here, with respect to identity diffusion for example, an optimal level is interpreted as the norm, as it is unrealistic to expect an individual to resolve all their conflicted identifications with others; therefore we should be alert to individuals with levels which are much higher or lower than the norm – highly diffused individuals are classified as diffused, and those with low levels as foreclosed or defensive. Weinreich applies the identity variant in a framework which also allows for the transition from one to another by way of biographical experiences and resolution of conflicted identifications situated in various contexts – for example, an adolescent going through family break-up may be in one state, whereas later in a stable marriage with a secure professional role may be in another. Hence, though there is continuity, there is also development and change.

Laing's definition of identity closely follows Erikson's, in emphasising the past, present and future components of the experienced self. He also develops the concept of the "metaperspective of self", i.e. the self's perception of the other's view of self, which has been found to be extremely important in clinical contexts such as anorexia nervosa. Harré also conceptualises components of self/identity – the "person" (the unique being I am to myself and others) along with aspects of self (including a totality of attributes including beliefs about one's characteristics including life history), and the personal characteristics displayed to others.

== In social psychology ==
At a general level, self-psychology explores the question of how the personal self relates to the social environment. Theories in "psychological" social psychology explain an individual's actions in a group in terms of mental events and states. However, some "sociological" social psychology theories go further by dealing with the issue of identity at the level of both individual cognition and collective behavior. George C. Homans, former President of the American Sociological Association, in a study of group outcomes, found that social isolation would lead to increasingly random and unpredictable behavior. Such a notion was explored in depth during the 1970s period of transition, among others by cultural historian Christopher Lasch, in his bestselling book The Culture of Narcissism.

=== Collective identity ===
Many people gain a sense of positive self-esteem from their identity groups, which furthers a sense of community and belonging. Another issue that researchers have attempted to address is the question of why people engage in discrimination, i.e., why they tend to favour those they consider a part of their "in-group" over those considered to be outsiders. Both questions have been given extensive attention by researchers working in the social identity tradition. For example, in work relating to social identity theory, it has been shown that merely crafting cognitive distinction between in- and out-groups can lead to subtle effects on people's evaluations of others.

Different social situations also compel people to attach themselves to different self-identities which may cause some to feel marginalized, switch between different groups and self-identifications, or reinterpret certain identity components. These different selves lead to constructed images dichotomized between what people want to be (the ideal self) and how others see them (the limited self). Educational background and occupational status and roles significantly influence identity formation in this regard.

=== Identity formation strategies ===
Another issue of interest in social psychology is related to the notion that there are certain identity formation strategies which a person may use to adapt to the social world. Cote and Levine developed a typology which investigated the different manners of behavior that individuals may have. Their typology includes:

Cote and Levine's identity formation strategy typology
Type	Psychological signs	Personality signs	Social signs
Refuser	Develops cognitive blocks that prevent adoption of adult role-schemas	Engages in childlike behavior	Shows extensive dependency upon others and no meaningful engagement with the community of adults
Drifter	Possesses greater psychological resources than the Refuser (i.e., intelligence, charisma)	Is apathetic toward application of psychological resources	Has no meaningful engagement with or commitment to adult communities
Searcher	Has a sense of dissatisfaction due to high personal and social expectations	Shows disdain for imperfections within the community	Interacts to some degree with role-models, but ultimately these relationships are abandoned
Guardian	Possesses clear personal values and attitudes, but also a deep fear of change	Sense of personal identity is almost exhausted by sense of social identity	Has an extremely rigid sense of social identity and strong identification with adult communities
Resolver	Consciously desires self-growth	Accepts personal skills and competencies and uses them actively	Is responsive to communities that provide opportunity for self-growth

Kenneth Gergen formulated additional classifications, which include the strategic manipulator, the pastiche personality, and the relational self. The strategic manipulator is a person who begins to regard all senses of identity merely as role-playing exercises, and who gradually becomes alienated from their social self. The pastiche personality abandons all aspirations toward a true or "essential" identity, instead viewing social interactions as opportunities to play out, and hence become, the roles they play. Finally, the relational self is a perspective by which persons abandon all sense of exclusive self, and view all sense of identity in terms of social engagement with others. For Gergen, these strategies follow one another in phases, and they are linked to the increase in popularity of postmodern culture and the rise of telecommunications technology.

== In social anthropology ==
Anthropologists have most frequently employed the term identity to refer to this idea of selfhood in a loosely Eriksonian way properties based on the uniqueness and individuality which makes a person distinct from others. Identity became of more interest to anthropologists with the emergence of modern concerns with ethnicity and social movements in the 1970s. This was reinforced by an appreciation, following the trend in sociological thought, of the manner in which the individual is affected by and contributes to the overall social context. At the same time, the Eriksonian approach to identity remained in force, with the result that identity has continued until recently to be used in a largely socio-historical way to refer to qualities of sameness in relation to a person's connection to others and to a particular group of people.

The first favours a primordialist approach which takes the sense of self and belonging to a collective group as a fixed thing, defined by objective criteria such as common ancestry and common biological characteristics. The second, rooted in social constructionist theory, takes the view that identity is formed by a predominantly political choice of certain characteristics. In so doing, it questions the idea that identity is a natural given, characterised by fixed, supposedly objective criteria. Both approaches need to be understood in their respective political and historical contexts, characterised by debate on issues of class, race and ethnicity. While they have been criticized, they continue to exert an influence on approaches to the conceptualisation of identity today.

These different explorations of 'identity' demonstrate how difficult a concept it is to pin down. Since identity is a virtual thing, it is impossible to define it empirically. Discussions of identity use the term with different meanings, from fundamental and abiding sameness, to fluidity, contingency, negotiated and so on. Brubaker and Cooper note a tendency in many scholars to confuse identity as a category of practice and as a category of analysis. Indeed, many scholars demonstrate a tendency to follow their own preconceptions of identity, following more or less the frameworks listed above, rather than taking into account the mechanisms by which the concept is crystallised as reality. In this environment, some analysts, such as Brubaker and Cooper, have suggested doing away with the concept completely. Others, by contrast, have sought to introduce alternative concepts in an attempt to capture the dynamic and fluid qualities of human social self-expression. Stuart Hall for example, suggests treating identity as a process, to take into account the reality of diverse and ever-changing social experience. Some scholars have introduced the idea of identification, whereby identity is perceived as made up of different components that are 'identified' and interpreted by individuals. The construction of an individual sense of self is achieved by personal choices regarding who and what to associate with. Such approaches are liberating in their recognition of the role of the individual in social interaction and the construction of identity.

Anthropologists have contributed to the debate by shifting the focus of research: One of the first challenges for the researcher wishing to carry out empirical research in this area is to identify an appropriate analytical tool. The concept of boundaries is useful here for demonstrating how identity works. In the same way as Barth, in his approach to ethnicity, advocated the critical focus for investigation as being "the ethnic boundary that defines the group rather than the cultural stuff that it encloses", social anthropologists such as Cohen and Bray have shifted the focus of analytical study from identity to the boundaries that are used for purposes of identification. If identity is a kind of virtual site in which the dynamic processes and markers used for identification are made apparent, boundaries provide the framework on which this virtual site is built. They concentrated on how the idea of community belonging is differently constructed by individual members and how individuals within the group conceive ethnic boundaries.

As a non-directive and flexible analytical tool, the concept of boundaries helps both to map and to define the changeability and mutability that are characteristic of people's experiences of the self in society. While identity is a volatile, flexible and abstract 'thing', its manifestations and the ways in which it is exercised are often open to view. Identity is made evident through the use of markers such as language, dress, behaviour and choice of space, whose effect depends on their recognition by other social beings. Markers help to create the boundaries that define similarities or differences between the marker wearer and the marker perceivers, their effectiveness depends on a shared understanding of their meaning. In a social context, misunderstandings can arise due to a misinterpretation of the significance of specific markers. Equally, an individual can use markers of identity to exert influence on other people without necessarily fulfilling all the criteria that an external observer might typically associate with such an abstract identity.

Boundaries can be inclusive or exclusive depending on how they are perceived by other people. An exclusive boundary arises, for example, when a person adopts a marker that imposes restrictions on the behaviour of others. An inclusive boundary is created, by contrast, by the use of a marker with which other people are ready and able to associate. At the same time, however, an inclusive boundary will also impose restrictions on the people it has included by limiting their inclusion within other boundaries. An example of this is the use of a particular language by a newcomer in a room full of people speaking various languages. Some people may understand the language used by this person while others may not. Those who do not understand it might take the newcomer's use of this particular language merely as a neutral sign of identity. But they might also perceive it as imposing an exclusive boundary that is meant to mark them off from the person. On the other hand, those who do understand the newcomer's language could take it as an inclusive boundary, through which the newcomer associates themself with them to the exclusion of the other people present. Equally, however, it is possible that people who do understand the newcomer but who also speak another language may not want to speak the newcomer's language and so see their marker as an imposition and a negative boundary. It is possible that the newcomer is either aware or unaware of this, depending on whether they themself knows other languages or is conscious of the plurilingual quality of the people there and is respectful of it or not.

== In religion ==
A religious identity is the set of beliefs and practices generally held by an individual, involving adherence to codified beliefs and rituals and study of ancestral or cultural traditions, writings, history, mythology, and faith and mystical experience. Religious identity refers to the personal practices related to communal faith along with rituals and communication stemming from such conviction. This identity formation begins with an association in the parents' religious contacts, and individuation requires that the person chooses the same or different religious identity than that of their parents.

The Parable of the Lost Sheep is one of the parables of Jesus. It is about a shepherd who leaves his flock of ninety-nine sheep in order to find the one which is lost. The parable of the lost sheep is an example of the rediscovery of identity. Its aim is to lay bare the nature of the divine response to the recovery of the lost, with the lost sheep representing a lost human being.

Christian meditation is a specific form of personality formation, though often used only by certain practitioners to describe various forms of prayer and the process of knowing the contemplation of God.

In Western culture, personal and secular identity are deeply influenced by the formation of Christianity, throughout history, various Western thinkers who contributed to the development of European identity were influenced by classical cultures and incorporated elements of Greek culture as well as Jewish culture, leading to some movements such as Philhellenism and Philosemitism.

== Implications ==
Due to the multiple functions of identity which include self-regulation, self-concept, personal control, meaning and direction, its implications are woven into many aspects of life.

=== Identity changes ===
==== Contexts Influencing Identity Changes ====
Identity transformations can occur in various contexts, some of which include:

1. Career Change: When individuals undergo significant shifts in their career paths or occupational identities, they face the challenge of redefining themselves within a new professional context.
2. Gender Identity Transition: Individuals experiencing gender dysphoria may embark on a journey to align their lives with their true gender identity. This process involves profound personal and social changes to establish an authentic sense of self.
3. National Immigration: Relocating to a new country necessitates adaptation to unfamiliar societal norms, leading to adjustments in cultural, social, and occupational identities.
4. Identity Change due to Climate Migration: In the face of environmental challenges and forced displacement, individuals may experience shifts in their identity as they adapt to new geographical locations and cultural contexts.
5. Adoption: Adoption entails exploring alternative familial features and reconciling with the experience of being adopted, which can significantly impact an individual's self-identity.
6. Illness Diagnosis: The diagnosis of an illness can provoke an identity shift, altering an individual's self-perception and influencing how they navigate life. Additionally, illnesses may result in changes in abilities, which can affect occupational identity and require adaptations.

==== Immigration and identity ====
Immigration and acculturation often lead to shifts in social identity. The extent of this change depends on the disparities between the individual's heritage culture and the culture of the host country, as well as the level of adoption of the new culture versus the retention of the heritage culture. However, the effects of immigration and acculturation on identity can be moderated if the person possesses a strong personal identity. This established personal identity can serve as an "anchor" and play a "protective role" during the process of social and cultural identity transformations that occur.

==== Occupational identity ====
Identity is an ongoing and dynamic process that impacts an individual's ability to navigate life's challenges and cultivate a fulfilling existence. Within this process, occupation emerges as a significant factor that allows individuals to express and maintain their identity. Occupation encompasses not only careers or jobs but also activities such as travel, volunteering, sports, or caregiving. However, when individuals face limitations in their ability to participate or engage in meaningful activities, such as due to illness, it poses a threat to the active process and continued development of identity. Feeling socially unproductive can have detrimental effects on one's social identity. Importantly, the relationship between occupation and identity is bidirectional; occupation contributes to the formation of identity, while identity shapes decisions regarding occupational choices. Furthermore, individuals inherently seek a sense of control over their chosen occupation and strive to avoid stigmatizing labels that may undermine their occupational identity.

===== Navigating stigma and occupational identity =====
In the realm of occupational identity, individuals make choices regarding employment based on the stigma associated with certain jobs. Likewise, those already working in stigmatized occupations may employ personal rationalization to justify their career path. Factors such as workplace satisfaction and overall quality of life play significant roles in these decisions. Individuals in such jobs face the challenge of forging an identity that aligns with their values and beliefs. Crafting a positive self-concept becomes more arduous when societal standards label their work as "dirty" or undesirable. Consequently, some individuals opt not to define themselves solely by their occupation but strive for a holistic identity that encompasses all aspects of their lives, beyond their job or work. On the other hand, individuals whose identity strongly hinges on their occupation may experience a crisis if they become unable to perform their chosen work. Therefore, occupational identity necessitates an active and adaptable process that ensures both adaptation and continuity amid shifting circumstances.

== Factors shaping the concept of identity ==
The modern notion of personal identity as a distinct and unique characteristic of individuals has evolved relatively recently in history beginning with the first passports in the early 1900s and later becoming more popular as a social science term in the 1950s. Several factors have influenced its evolution, including:

1. Protestant Influence: In Western societies, the Protestant tradition has underscored individuals' responsibility for their own soul or spiritual well-being, contributing to a heightened focus on personal identity.
2. Development of Psychology: The emergence of psychology as a separate field of knowledge and study starting in the 19th century has played a significant role in shaping our understanding of identity.
3. Rise of Privacy: The Renaissance era witnessed a growing sense of privacy, leading to increased attention and importance placed on individual identities.
4. Specialization in Work: The industrial period brought about a shift from undifferentiated roles in feudal systems to specialized worker roles. This change impacted how individuals identified themselves in relation to their occupations.
5. Occupation and Identity: The concept of occupation as a crucial aspect of identity was introduced by Christiansen in 1999, highlighting the influence of employment and work roles on an individual's sense of self.
6. Focus on Gender Identity: There has been an increased emphasis on gender identity, including issues related to gender dysphoria and transgender experiences. These discussions have contributed to a broader understanding of diverse identities including various sexual identities.
7. Relevance of Identity in Personality Pathology: Understanding and assessing personality pathology has highlighted the significance of identity problems in comprehending individuals' psychological well-being.

== See also ==
- Cultural identity – Identity or feeling of belonging to a group
- Culture – Social behavior and norms of a society
- Gender self-identification – Social and legal concept regarding transgender rights
- Identity formation – Process in which humans develop a view of themselves and of their identity
- Identity performance – How persons present themselves in social interactions
- Identity politics – Politics based on one's identity
- Online identity – Social identity in an online community
- Passing – Ability to be regarded as having an identity one does not
- Racial dysphoria
- Role engulfment
- Self-consciousness – Acute sense of self-awareness, a preoccupation with oneself
- Self-discovery – Person attempts to determine how they feel about spiritual issues or priorities
- Social defeat – Loss in a confrontation between animals, including humans
- Social stigma – Type of discrimination or disapproval

== Bibliography ==
- Anderson, B (1983). Imagined Communities. Reflections on the Origin and Spread of Nationalism. London: Verso.
- Barnard, A.; Spencer, J., eds. (1996). Encyclopedia of Social and Cultural Anthropology. London: Routledge.
- Barth, F. (1969). Ethnic Groups and Boundaries. Oslo: Bergen.
- Bourdieu, Pierre (1991). Language and Symbolic Power. Cambridge: Harvard University Press.
- Bray, Z. (2004). Living Boundaries: Frontiers and Identity in the Basque Country. Brussels: Presses interuniversitaires européenes, Peter Lang.
- Brubaker, R. (2002). Ethnicity without Groups. Cambridge: Harvard University Press.
- Brockmeier, J. & Carbaugh, D. (2001). Narrative and Identity: Studies in Autobiography, Self and Culture. Amsterdam/Philadelphia: John Benjamins.
- Brubaker, R.; Cooper, F. (2000). "Beyond 'Identity'" (PDF). Theory and Society. 29: 1–47. doi:10.1023/A:1007068714468. hdl:2027.42/43651. S2CID 8365767.
- Calhoun, C. (1994). "Social Theory and the Politics of Identity", in C. Calhoun (Ed.), Social Theory and Identity Politics. Oxford: Blackwell.
- Camilleri, C.; Kastersztein, J. & Lipiansky E.M. et al. (1990) Stratégies Identitaires. Paris: Presses Universitaires de France.
- Carey, H. C. (1877). Principles of social science. Philadelphia: J.B. Lippincott & Co.
- Carey, H. C. & McLean, K. (1864). Manual of social science; being a condensation of the "Principles of social science" of H.C. Carey, LL. D.. Philadelphia: H.C. Baird.
- Cohen, A. (1974). Two-Dimensional: an essay on the anthropology of power and symbolism in complex society. London: Routledge
- Cohen, A. (1998). "Boundaries and Boundary-Consciousness: Politicising Cultural Identity", in M. Anderson and E. Bort (Eds.), The Frontiers of Europe. London: Printer Press.
- Cohen, A. (1994). Self Consciousness: An Alternative Anthropology of Identity. London: Routledge.
- Hallam, E. M., et al. (1999). Beyond the Body: Death and Social Identity. London: Routledge. ISBN 0-415-18291-3.
- Ibarra, Herminia (2003). Working identity: unconventional strategies for reinventing your career. Harvard Business Press. ISBN 978-1-57851-778-7.
- James, Paul (2015). "Despite the Terrors of Typologies: The Importance of Understanding Categories of Difference and Identity". Interventions: International Journal of Postcolonial Studies. 17 (2): 174–195. doi:10.1080/1369801X.2014.993332. S2CID 142378403.
- Kurzwelly, J (2019). "Being German, Paraguayan and Germanino: Exploring the Relation Between Social and Personal Identity". Identity. 19 (2): 144–156. doi:10.1080/15283488.2019.1604348.
- Leary, M. R.; Tangney, J. P. (2003). Handbook of self and identity. New York:Guilford Press. ISBN 1-57230-798-6.
- Little, D. (1991). Varieties of social explanation: an introduction to the philosophy of social science. Boulder: Westview Press. ISBN 0-8133-0566-7.
- Meyers, D. T. (2004). Being yourself: essays on identity, action, and social life. Feminist constructions. Lanham, Md: Rowman & Littlefield Publishers. ISBN 0-7425-1478-1
- Modood, T. & Werbner P. (Eds.) (1997). The Politics of Multiculturalism in the New Europe: Racism, Identity and Community. London: Zed Books.
- Ricoeur, Paul; Blamey, Kathleen (1995). Oneself as Another (Soi-même comme un autre), trans. Kathleen Blamey. Chicago: University of Chicago Press. ISBN 978-0-226-71329-8.
- Smith, A.D. (1986). The Ethnic Origin of Nations. Oxford: Blackwell.
- Cote, James E.; Levine, Charles (2002), Identity Formation, Agency, and Culture, New Jersey: Lawrence Erlbaum Associates
- Mead, George H. (1934). Mind, Self, and Society. Chicago: University of Chicago Press.
- Stryker, Sheldon (1968). "Identity Salience and Role Performance". Journal of Marriage and the Family. 30 (4): 558–64. doi:10.2307/349494. JSTOR 349494.
- Stryker, Sheldon; Burke, Peter J. (December 2000). "The Past, Present, and Future of an Identity Theory". Social Psychology Quarterly. 63 (4): 284–297. doi:10.2307/2695840. JSTOR 2695840. S2CID 5849744.
- Hasan Bülent Paksoy (2006) IDENTITIES: How Governed, Who Pays? Malaga: Entelequia. 2nd Ed.
- "Social Identity Theory". Universiteit Twente. 9 September 2004. Archived from the original on 31 December 2006.
- Sökefeld, M. (1999). "Debating Self, Identity, and Culture in Anthropology". Current Anthropology 40 (4), August–October, 417–31.
- Thompson, R.H. (1989). Theories of Ethnicity. New York: Greenwood Press.
- Tracy, S. J.; Tretheway, A. (2005). "Fracturing the Real-Self-Fake-Self Dichotomy: Moving Toward "Crystallized Organizational Discourses and Identities"". Communication Theory. 15 (2): 168–195. doi:10.1111/j.1468-2885.2005.tb00331.x. S2CID 9699291.
- Tracy, S. J.; Scott, C. (2006). "Sexuality, masculinity and taint management among firefighters and correctional officers: Getting down and dirty with America's heroes and the scum of law enforcement". Management Communication Quarterly. 20 (1): 6–38. doi:10.1177/0893318906287898. S2CID 143657813.
- Vermeulen, H. & Gowers, C. (Eds.) (1994). The Anthropology of Ethnicity: 'Beyond Ethnic Groups and Boundaries'. Amsterdam: Het Spinhuis.
- Vryan, Kevin D., Patricia A. Adler, Peter Adler. 2003. "Identity". pp. 367–390 in Handbook of Symbolic Interactionism, edited by Larry T. Reynolds and Nancy J. Herman-Kinney. Walnut Creek, CA: AltaMira.
- Ward, L. F. (1897). Dynamic sociology, or Applied social science. New York: D. Appleton and company.
- Ward, L. F. (1968). Dynamic sociology. Series in American studies. New York: Johnson Reprint Corp.
- Weinreich, P. (1986). The operationalisation of identity theory in racial and ethnic relations, in J.Rex and D.Mason (eds). "Theories of Race and Ethnic Relations". Cambridge: Cambridge University Press.
- Weinreich, Peter; Saunderson, Wendy, eds. (2003). Analysing identity: cross-cultural, societal, and clinical contexts. London: Routledge. ISBN 978-0-415-64581-2. OCLC 252748181.
  - Saunderson, Wendy; O'Kane, Maria (2003). "Anorexia nervosa: Analysing identity for predisposing, precipitating and perpetuating factors". In Weinreich, Peter; Saunderson, Wendy (eds.). Analysing identity: cross-cultural, societal, and clinical contexts. London: Routledge. ISBN 978-0-415-64581-2. OCLC 252748181.
- Werbner, P. and T. Modood. (Eds.) (1997). Debating Cultural Hybridity: Multi-Cultural Identities and the Politics of Anti-Racism. London: Zed Books.
- Williams, J. M. (1920). The foundations of social science; an analysis of their psychological aspects. New York: A.A. Knopf.
- Woodward, K. (2004). Questioning Identity: Gender, Class, Ethnicity. London: Routledge. ISBN 0-415-32967-1
