= Role engulfment =

In labeling theory, role engulfment refers to how a person's identity becomes based on a role the person assumes, superseding other roles.

A negative role such as "sick" can serve to constrict a person's self-image.

== Professions ==
Jungians have highlighted the possibility of role engulfment by one's profession: "every calling or profession has its own characteristic persona...the danger is that people become identical with their personas—the professor with his textbook, the tenor with his voice". The problem is particularly acute with what Alasdair Macintyre calls characters—"a very special type of social role which places a certain kind of moral constraint on the personality of those who inhabit them...masks worn by moral philosophies".

== Athletics ==
Role engulfment can also occur in a more mainstream context. It has been explored, for example, with regard to college athletes. Having initially entered college with a "broad" agenda, many then 'experienced "role-engulfment"...the "greedy role" of athletics soon dominated their time, actions, and social circles'. Athletes may have themselves narrowed their focus too early: 'one of the consequences of identity foreclosure or role engulfment was the inability to foresee and plan for future roles'.

== Mothers ==
Family therapy sees part of the father's role in early child-raising, faced with maternal engulfment, as 'to haul her back, to reclaim her, as it were, from the baby. So that the two of them can put their own relationship as a married couple first again'. (It also notes a potentially wider need 'to see new meanings put into role names' in a family context). Whereas some '"good" mothers are able to demonstrate role commitment without role engulfment', others may find the role of "devoted mother" becomes an all-embracing one. 'Role engulfment, by reducing the opportunities for contacts with friends and family, leaves the parent with fewer sources of positive self-evaluation outside of the family'.

== Deviance ==
Edwin Schur, building on the work of Erik H. Erikson and Kai Erikson on "The Confirmation of the Delinquent" brought the term "role engulfment" to the theoretical fore in relation to deviancy: '"Role engulfment" refers to the process whereby persons become caught up in the deviant role as a result of others relating to them largely in terms of their spoiled identity'. Conversely, the deviant may themselves embrace the role. 'When a particular role becomes an integral part of a person's identity, almost to the exclusion of all other roles, role merger (or role engulfment) is said to occur. Such a role is often referred to as a "master role"'.

== Literary ==
- Tony Tanner explored the contrasting role performances of Mr and Mrs Bennet in Pride and Prejudice in terms of role commitment and role distance. Where 'Mr Bennet has become completely cynical about the social roles he is called on to play...gestures of disengagement from the necessary rituals of family and society, Mrs Bennet, incapable of reflection, loses herself in her performance'—role engulfment.
- Margaret Atwood's characters struggle against the way 'consumer images express role-engulfment as an omnipresent fate'—strive to 'escape from role-engulfment...from this alienating cultural definition of personality and human relations'.

== Related terms ==
The term role domination also refers to the process of how a particular role comes to dominate over other roles in a person's life.

Role abandonment refers to the disassociation of and detachment of other goals, priorities, and roles following role engulfment.

== See also ==
- Ideal womanhood
- Identity (social science)
- Identity formation
- Role conflict
- Role model
- Role suction
- Total institution
