= Weakland =

Weakland is a surname, likely an Americanized form of the German surname Wickland. Notable people with the surname include:

- John Weakland (1919–1995), American psychotherapist
- Rembert Weakland (1927–2022), American monk and archbishop

== See also ==
- Wickland (disambiguation)
