= Social media and identity =

Impacts of social media

Social media can have both positive and negative impacts on a user's identity. Scholars within the fields of psychology and communication study the relationship between social media and identity in order to understand individual behavior, psychological impacts, and social patterns. Communication within political or social groups online can result in practical application, real-world implementation of a concept, of those found identities or the adoption of them as a whole. Young people, defined as emerging adults in or entering college, are especially likely to have their identities shaped by social media.

== Young adults ==
Young adults are especially influenced by social media, where they find social groups to belong to.

Research shows that nearly half of teens believe social media platforms has a negative impact on people their age. Psychologists believe that at a time when young adults are coming into adolescence, they are more likely to be influenced by what they see on sites like Instagram or Twitter. Most young adults will widely share, with varying degrees of accuracy, honesty, and openness, information that in the past would have been private or reserved for select individuals. Key questions include whether they accurately portray their identities online and whether the use of social media might impact young adults' identity development. Media Imagery, in particular, is said to be a major influence on the minds of young men and women. Studies have shown that it is even more relevant when it comes to the issue of body image. Social media, in part, has been created to host a safe haven for those who do not claim a solid identity in the material world, but past identities are not easy to escape from since the Internet preserves much of the information that was shared.

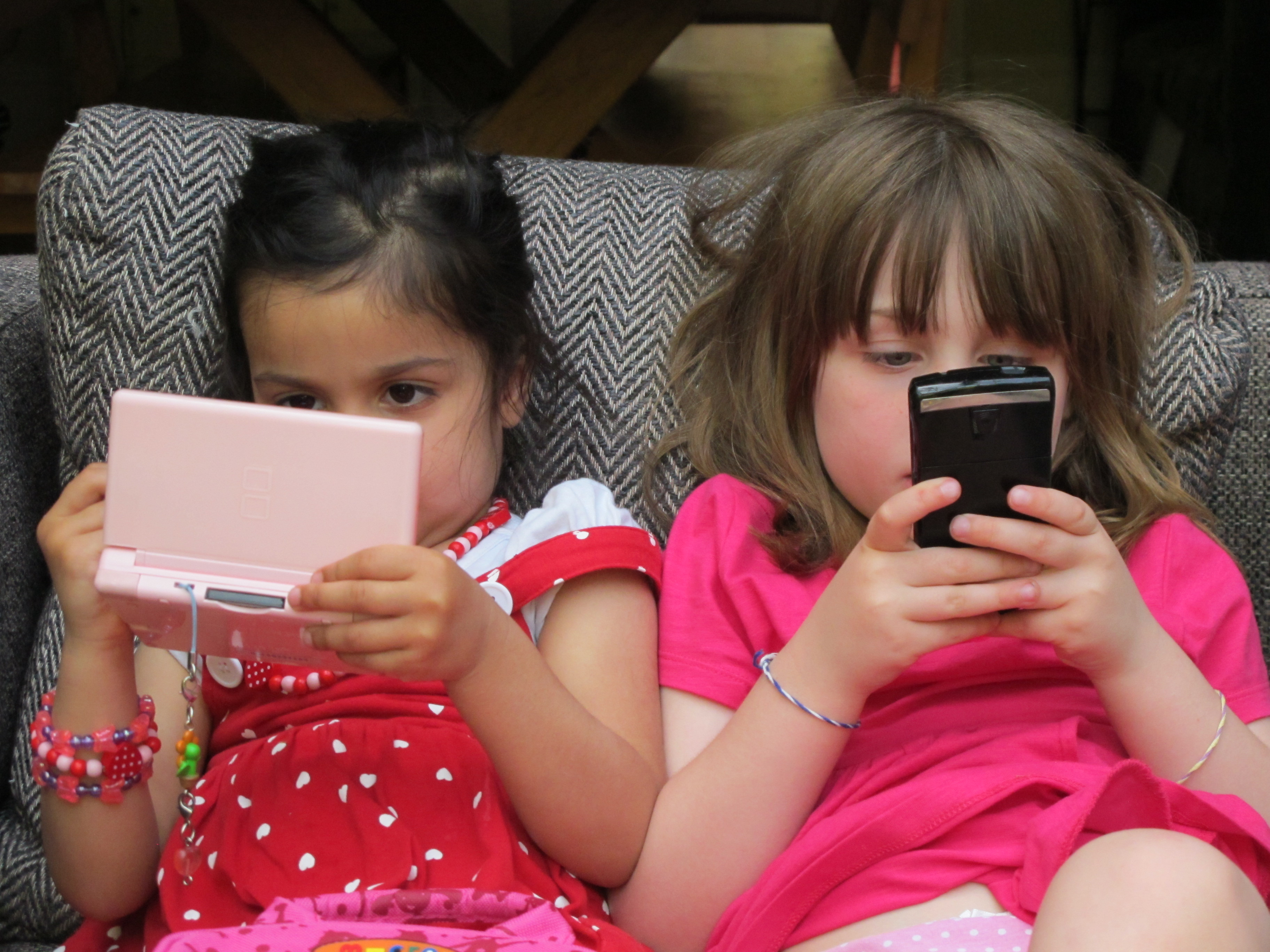
Young children play with mobile phones and gaming devices.

Social media is an essential part of the social lives of young adults. They rely on it to maintain relationships, create new relationships, and stay up to date with the world around them. Adolescents find social media to be extremely helpful when changing environments, like moving off to university for example. Social media provides students, especially first year students, the opportunity to create the identity they want the world to see. However, it has been seen that these students create online personas that may not reflect their true selves bringing up the issues of impression management. Social media provides young adults with the opportunity to present themselves as something other than their authentic self.

== Media literacy ==
The definition of media literacy has evolved over time to encompass a range of experiences that can occur in social media or other digital spaces. The definition of media literacy is also broad and wide ranging in its context.

Currently, media literacy is the idea that one is able to analyze, evaluate, and interact with media content in a meaningful way. Educators teach media literacy skills because of the vulnerable relationship that young adults can have with social media. Some examples of media literacy practices, particularly on Twitter, include using hashtags, live tweeting, and sharing information. One of the overall goals of media literacy within the context of social media is to keep young adults aware of potentially violent, graphic, or dangerous content that they may come across on the internet, and how to determine if the content is credible while engaging responsibly with it.

In order to be considered media-literate, a person must be able to take in media from online and social platforms and have the correct competencies and context to be able to organize the information. In order to be considered media-literate, the digital information must be given to the user in a way that it can be put into the correct perspective and analyzed, deducted and synthesized.

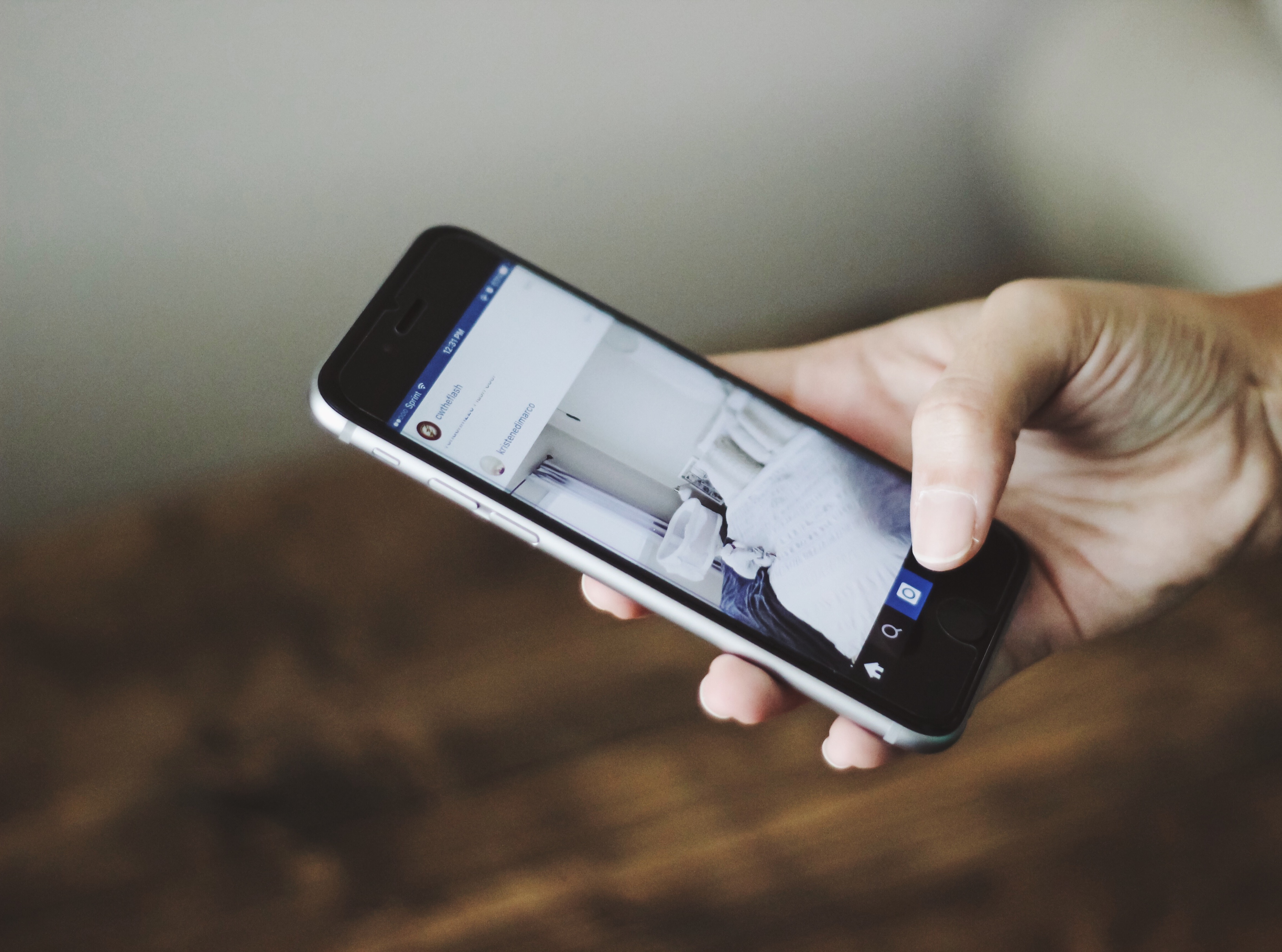
Browsing Instagram

Teenagers and young adults can be vulnerable to specific content online outside of their age-range. Media literacy campaigns and education research shows that targeting those who fall into this age category would be the best way to understand and target their needs as young online users.

There are multiple individual studies investigating social media identity relating to media literacy online, however there is a need for much more conclusive information that analyzes multiple studies at a time. Social media literacy is still considered an under-researched topic. Many scholars in media literacy research emphasize the impact of training young adults to consume media in a safe way is the major solution for furthering internet education in children and young adults. The more information the young adults are given on media literacy, the better prepared they are to enter the digital world confidently.

One scientific model that has been proposed, known as The Social Media Literacy (SMILE) model is a framework that hypothesizes that at the core of this model it is helping young adults truly know the meaning and display the actions of media literacy online. SMILE is also meant to inspire more research on the subject of media literacy as it relates to social media effects and young adult learning abilities. The model was applied through the lens of a social media positivity bias among adolescents and puts forth five different assumptions about social media and media literacy;

1. Social media literacy as a moderator (what is seen on social media)
2. Social media literacy as a predictor (what is seen for specific individuals on social media)
3. Media literacy within social media is a reciprocal process
4. The development of social media literacy depends on a conditional process of variables affecting other variables
5. Media literacy within social media is a differential learning process, and who teaches it is highly affective of the outcome

This model also stresses that human beings learn media literacy (and social media literacy) naturally as they go through life. Research suggests that having young adults taught media literacy from an educator may make them less interested (and therefore less careful) of threats on social media.

== Self Presentation ==
People create images of themselves to present to the public, a process called self presentation. Depending on the demographic, presenting oneself as authentic can result in identity clarity. Methods of self presentation can also be influenced by geography. The framework for this relationship between a user's location and their social media presentation is called the spatial self. Users depict their spatial self in order to include their physical space as a part of their self presentation to an audience.

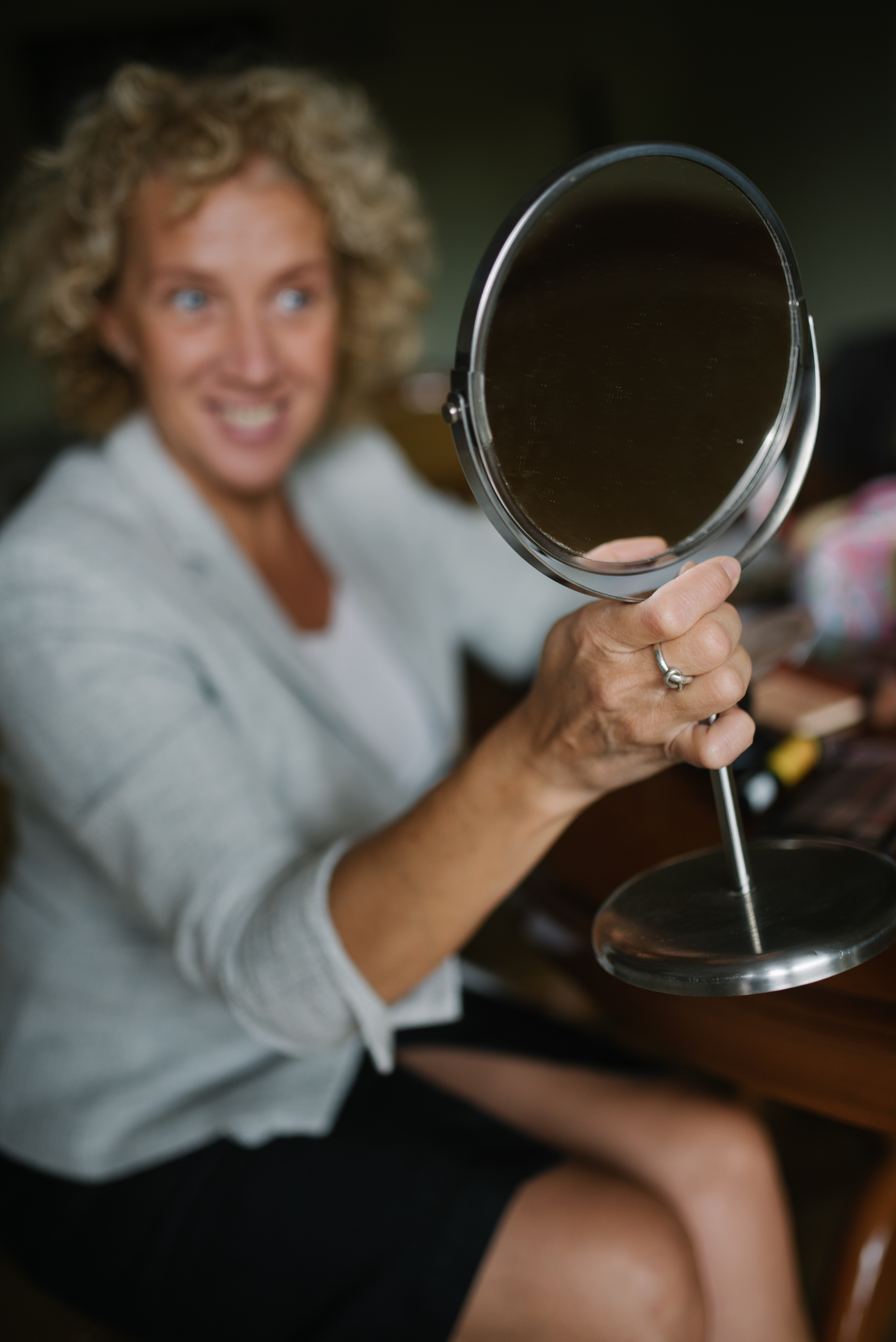
Woman examining her own reflection in a mirror.

According to a 2018 research paper, patients of plastic surgeons have gone in and asked for specific snapchat "filter" features. This led to a theory of Snapchat Dysmorphia. Since the introduction to snapchat in 2011, more and more people each year are going into doctor offices and asking for smoother skin, bigger eyes, and fuller lips. It is creating a disconnect from who they are and who they want to be.

Social comparison theory is the idea that people are likely to compare themselves to people who are similar to them. Influencers have impacted this idea, we often watch people on the internet that we feel we can relate too. Within this theory there is 2 subcategories; Upward and downward comparison. Upward comparison is the idea that someone compares themselves to someone they feel is better than they are. Downward is the opposite, they compare themselves to someone they feel is worse off.

Cultivation theory is the more often people are going to be exposed to images of society's ideal body, the less they are going to realize the images are unrealistic

Self Schema Theory is the idea women use three points to determine how they view themself

1. Socially ideal: ideal ways women are represented in media
2. Objective body: how we view our own self
3. Internalized ideal body: Internalizing media and how much they want to achieve it.

== The Female Identity ==
For centuries, women have been a social minority in a male-dominated society. Feminists have taken measures to prove that there is more to the female identity than good looks or the ability to reproduce children. These efforts to raise awareness and make change have been made more efficient with the rise of social media. Social media is not only used to share information, but people also use social media as a means of self-expression. Social networking allows people to find others with similar values and grow a community that respects, understands, and accepts their identity.

The negative effects of discrimination on social media.

Social media is also an environment that harbors discrimination, even among relatives and peers, who may not agree with aspects of someone’s identity. Therefore, multiple social media platforms exist, each with their own unique design, for the purpose of sharing different aspects of one’s identity, sometimes even anonymously.

Women’s online identities often rely heavily on physical appearance rather than personality and moral values. Women are expected to look attractive in order to be successful on social media, and the level of attractiveness is most often defined by traditional Western standards of beauty. People who do not conform to such standards risk being harassed and body shamed on social media, even if such standards are impossible to meet. This discrimination and expectation of holding such standards can be harmful, leading to depression, disorders, and self-loathing among women, particularly black women, whose physical appearance may contrast greatly from Western standards.

Studies have demonstrated that body image is not necessarily influenced by how much time is spent on social media, but is influenced by the way an individual engages with the site. For instance, Meier and Gray (2014), measured Facebook usage among young women and found that those who more frequently viewed posts of images and videos were more likely to experience negative thoughts about their own body image and internalize the thin ideal. However, it is seen that Facebook did not influence body image itself. More interacting on Facebook, in regards to posting, commenting and viewing, causes women, specifically high school females to have greater weight dissatisfaction, drive for thinness, thin-ideal internalization and self objectification. The opportunity to compare one's body to those of others on social media can cause people to feel like they should look a certain way. Facebook posts more than 10 million photos an hour, so having many examples of an idealistic body-type tempts viewers to compare their bodies to their own.

Studies have shown that users can also experience feelings of body dissatisfaction when consuming rather than creating content. In a study conducted by Fardouly, et al. (2015), the implications of Facebook usage on young women's mood, level of body dissatisfaction, and desires to change aspects of their body or facial features were examined. The results of the study indicated that in addition to Facebook usage being associated with a more negative mood, it was associated with an increasing desire to change facial related features in women who were more likely to make comparisons between elements of their and others appearance.

Pescott (2020) study found that the use of Snapchat filters in preteens has a great impact on how they present themselves online. Boys found filters to be more fun and used for entertainment, whereas girls used filters more as a beauty enhancer. This becomes dangerous for preteens who are not aware of when a filter is being used when consuming content from friends, influencers, or celebrities. The same study found that the use of filters can have a large impact on preteens' identity formation as they begin to compare themselves with others.

== Influences on body image ==
In comparison to traditional forms of media, where individuals could only act as consumers of media, social media networking sites provide a more engaging opportunity where users can produce their own content, as well as interact with other users and content creators. As these sites have become increasingly popular, researchers have turned their focus to the discussion of the various impacts social media has on users. One of the main focuses researchers have studied is the effects on body image. This is especially seen in adolescents and young adults who engage in social media.

It has been suggested that in the early adolescent years, when perceptions about self and identity are being formed, individuals may be influenced by the media to feel certain ways about their bodies based on the ideal body types expressed and perpetuated in the media, which may increase body surveillance behaviors and, consequently, experiencing feelings of body shame. Salomon & Brown (2019), measured self-objectification behaviors on social media, body surveillance behaviors, feelings of body shame, and levels of self-monitoring to examine whether or not young adolescents engaging in higher amounts of self-objectification behaviors on social media also experienced higher levels of body shame.

Self-objectification behaviors result from internalizing objectification from others, and may, for example, take the form of taking frequent photos of oneself and valuing how others view their appearance. Body surveillance behaviors indicate a preoccupation with how the appearance of one's body will be perceived by others and can be measured by behaviors such as constant evaluation and monitoring of one's body. Body shame refers to a negative emotional experience resulting from feeling as if one failed to meet society's body ideals. Self-monitoring refers to how much individuals do or do not change their behavior in response to feedback and cues received from peers. In the study, it was found that individuals who reported engaging in self-objectified social media use exhibited more body surveillance behaviors, which led to increased experience in feelings of body shame.

In response to self-portraits on social media, friends and followers can indicate affirmation and acceptance, and creators can receive validation, through feedback such as likes and comments. According to the findings of Bukowski, Dixon, and Weeks (2019), the more value that an individual placed on the feedback received on a self-portrait that they've shared, the more they experience body dissatisfaction and a desire to become thinner, but only if they also engage in body-surveillance.

Some research on beauty filters has introduced the idea of "social self-comparison," which is where users compare their unfiltered appearance with an idealized, filtered version of themselves. A study of 187 social media users found that comparison processes were highest when participants applied a slimming filter to their own image, and was associated with an increase desire for weight-loss and self-objectification.

== Platform Affordances ==
The different platform affordances of social media sites can both enable and constrain the options users have for presenting themselves. Initially coined by Gibson (1966), Affordances, broadly, can be defined as "describing what material artifacts such as media technologies allow people to do". This can therefore be applied to how users of social media construct identity, through the ways in which social media sites provide users with opportunities for self-presentation.

For example, Instagram requires users to create a profile when they register an account. In this, they require a username, profile photo, biography and more recently, the option to present the users chosen pronoun. However, none of these identifiable aspects need to be factual, and unlike Facebook, which requires users to register with their legal name, Instagram users can use pseudonyms or made-up usernames and profile pictures. This gives them the ability to construct whichever identity they choose to present.

== Fact-Checking Media ==
Combating fake news and becoming media literate requires a critical approach toward online information to ensure that the media consumed is accurate and reliable. There are many ways to determine if the media sources content is accurate, however one of the most effective strategies is fact-checking which delves into verifying the sources before sharing content. This would include checking whether the information came from a reputable outlet, cross-referencing multiple credible sources, and recognizing manipulative techniques such as deepfakes or selectively edited images. Understanding bias is also a crucial aspect to being able to determine credibility in sources. Media literacy involves questioning the intent behind content, identifying whether sources have a political or commercial agenda, and being aware of personal biases that might affect interpretation. Social media users can benefit from utilizing fact-checking websites such as Snopes, PolitiFact, or government fact-checking initiatives. Additionally, practicing skepticism before accepting viral content at face value, engaging in discussions that challenge misinformation, and staying educated on emerging digital threats contribute to stronger media literacy. By preparing individuals with the ability to discern reliable information, it creates a more informed and responsible digital society.

It is important for people to understand how to fact-check media as it allows for people, especially young adults and adolescents, to be able to ensure the media they are consuming is accurate. Beyond fostering a more informed and responsible digital society, media literacy can also play a role in mental health. The exposure to misinformation and harmful online content can contribute to heightened anxiety, stress, and feelings of uncertainty. By equipping individuals with the ability to critically assess media, they can avoid the psychological toll of misinformation and fosters the maintainment of healthier relationships with digital content. Some studies suggest that practicing skepticism and engaging in fact-checking can enhance the emotional resilience, thus helping individuals feel more in control of the information they consume. Additionally, media literacy empowers users to navigate social media in a way that can foster positive mental well-being, allowing them to engage with supportive communities while avoiding harmfully potential narratives.

== Media Reactions Within Companies ==
Frank J Lexa and David Fessell managed to test and review a hypothetical question given to a group of MD's from various universities. The question asks if a key radiologist posted a media post that involved a racial epithet and a younger colleague brought this to your attention, what would you do? Response replies varied, but almost all had one common theme/connection that connected to points made by Darren L Linvell in discussing the dangers of social media. Linvell made a point to bring up how digital civility is key in producing healthy online dynamics and connections. The respondents within Frank J Lexas and David Fessells test, answered by saying how immediate communication would take place to set the basics of the situation down. This focuses on creating civility through proper communication. Another connection seen is that in case of media controversies, training and policy making methods would take place such as sensitivity training. Other policies would take place depending on what specific policies a certain workplace may have. So, within work settings, it is seen to be important to first make sure an establishment has already implemented policy making methods for various cases, and also create an employee board that is able to demonstrate and carry out digital civility.

== Increased Policymaking ==
The creation of social media has brought along with it various ways for people all around the world to communicate. This media has created a system for all kinds of peoples to connect, create new identities, improve relationships, share information, and be able to make use of opportunities. This same media has also given way for young adolescents to access their way into a world of mental health issues, negative self image, racial hostility, cyberbullying, sexual harassment, stalking, and even suicide.

As social media continues to fall into the hands of younger children, it is necessary to implement policy making strategies in order to decrease the rate of harm towards adolescents who are more susceptible and fall victim to the dangers that are presented with social media use so it is necessary to implement. 13 year old girls are given access to view methods on how to consume under 300 calories a day through Tik Tok, but youth within the U.S. has been having access to these various kinds of platforms for some while now. Adolescents consuming unhealthy media leads to mental health issues revolving around depression, eating disorders, and sometimes even leading to suicide. Due to this, a research program by the name The Strategic Training Initiative for the Prevention of Eating Disorders (STRIPED) has begun to study the dangerous and harmful effects of social media platforms and how we are able to regulate social media's presentation of harmful content. It has been found that $11 billion revenue has been made from users ages 0-17 through advertisement methods which is why companies continue to display harmful content to youth.

Darren L Linvell discusses the "dark side" of social media which is the dangers that are brought along to students within and beyond a college campus. Social media use within students in the college age range use social media as a way to be able to display themselves. Some students choose to display their authentic selves, while others choose to create a different persona to present to surrounding peers. But, social media does come with its dangers such as cyberbullying, racial hostility, aggression, stalking, et. When students present whichever persona they display publicly online, they are at risk of falling victim to cyberbullying. Cyberbullying produces a larger number of bystanders than physical bullying as it is seen as less serious and that the victim brought on the situation to themselves. But, both cyberbullying and physical bullying have the same unfortunate outcomes such as mental health impacts and even suicide. The importance of the idea of teaching social media literacy to students to increase levels of safety within social media through education. Students may not always care to engage in this method, so it is more recommended to focus on the process and communication that occurs in order to give the result of certain information when engaging with information given. Another main focus is also the concept of digital civility as it requires creating healthy relationships through building mutual understanding with each other by learning to communicate properly. Rather than focusing on teaching students all aspects of social media literacy/safety, the light focuses on human communication skills because students are more likely to be engaged and educated more from this method to develop higher social media literacy.

Overall, it is seen that unsafe and sometimes even safe media use, can bring upon negative outcomes such as dangers and various threats that young adolescents have to deal with. Various law making policies are attempting to be made, but current laws create an obstruction in that path which make it difficult to create laws to fight media dangers. Due to this, families and adolescents have to take matters into their own hands to protect themselves from media harm. Fortunately, various sources such as the APA give helpful and effective recommendations to help protect themselves. It is important to address privacy and awareness matters when dealing with media use. Social media is a platform that gives access to endless opportunities and possibilities, but in order to keep this progression up, it is necessary to create effective legal policies as well as understand basic media literacy and digital civility.
