= Arthur Guirdham =

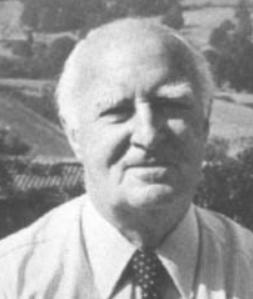
- Born: Workington, Cumberland, England, United Kingdom
- Occupations: Psychiatrist, writer
- Writing career
- Period: 20th century
- Genre: Parapsychology
- Subjects: Cathars, reincarnation

Arthur Guirdham (1905–1992) was an English physician, psychiatrist, novelist, and writer on the Cathar sect, alternative medicine, ESP and reincarnation.

== Biography ==
He was born in Workington, Cumberland, (Note: In A foot in both World's, in conversation with a woman born in Penrith, in Cumberland, Guirdham states that he did not go there and spent most of his time between the (west) coast and Loweswater.) into a working-class family of Huguenot descent – his father was a steel worker – yet he unusually gained a scholarship from technical school in Workington to Oxford University. He graduated from both Oxford University and Charing Cross. While pursuing a career in psychiatry, Guirdham was also a tireless writer, supported by the nearly full-time secretarial and editing assistance of his wife Mary. His book Disease and the Social System (1942) was a groundbreaking meditation on the connections between biological disease and industrialized food and the social stresses of modernity. His book The Theory of Disease (1957), mentioned in Brian Inglis' History of Medicine, offered an early alternative perspective on mental illness and personality, including some ideas later taken up by the anti-psychiatry movement. Guirdham continued to write indefatigably in a variety of genres, including poetry.

After writing a couple of wartime thrillers he became increasingly interested in esoteric history and reincarnation. His books The Lake and the Castle (1976) and The Great Heresy: The History and Beliefs of the Cathars (1977) describe the Cathar faith. He also wrote on Sigmund Freud and C. G. Jung. Most successful, however, were his books on reincarnation, notably The Cathars and Reincarnation, which were translated into several languages and won him a loyal audience of enthusiasts and a significant role within British studies of the paranormal and alternative perspectives on mental illness.

Novelist and occult writer Colin Wilson was a friend of Guirdham and stayed at his house on a number of occasions. He wrote approvingly of Guirdham's reincarnation claims. Wilson interviewed Guirdham for his book Strange Powers (1973).

== Reception ==
Guirdham's unorthodox ideas about psychosomatic medicine were criticized by the medical community. Professor D. V. Hubble in the British Medical Journal noted that:

"Dr. Guirdham takes the Freudian theories of repression and the unconscious and extends them to the conclusion that the three types of disease-neurosis, functional (autonomic) disorders, and organic stress diseases-result from a repression of emotion into three strata, differing in depth, of the unconscious mind. The theory appears to be supported by little enough evidence; indeed, throughout the book the factual basis for Dr. Guirdham's theories is not considerable."

Brian Inglis who was supportive of some of Guirdham's ideas wrote that a negative aspect of his writing was that he tended "to make sweeping assertions unsupported by evidence".

Psychologist Robert A. Baker listed Guirdham and Carl Wickland as early psychiatrists who preferred to "ignore the science and embrace the supernatural".

Historical researcher Ian Wilson has criticized the reincarnation claims of Guirdham noting "serious errors and inconsistencies" in his book The Cathars and Reincarnation. Wilson wrote that "Guirdham's claims lacking any means of independent verification, must be regarded as unacceptable."

== Publications ==
- Disease and the Social System (1942)
- The Lights Were Going Out (1944)
- These Paid (1946)
- I-A Stranger (1949)
- A Theory of Disease (1957)
- Christ and Freud: A Study of Religious Experience and Observance (1959)
- Man: Divine or Social (1960)
- The Nature of Healing (1964)
- The Cathars and Reincarnation (1970)
- The Gibbet and the Cross (1970)
- Obsession: Psychic Forces and Evil in the Causation of Disease (1972)
- A Foot in Both World's: A Doctor's Autobiography of Psychic Experience (1973)
- We Are One Another (1974)
- The Lake and the Castle (1976)
- The Great Heresy: The History and Beliefs of the Cathars (1977)
- The Psyche in Medicine (1978)
- Paradise Found: Reflections on Psychic Survival (1980)
- The Island (1980)
- The Psychic Dimensions of Mental Health (1982)

== See also ==
- Reincarnation research
