= Role of national identification in mental structure =

The role of national identification in mental structure or psychological role of national identity emanates from the ideology of identity formation, which in other cases, is referred to as individuation. Therefore, individuation is the development of dissimilar temperament of a person, which constitutes to a continuous entity and how a person is known or recognized. Thus, national identification is both a philosophical and ethical concept. It is where all citizens are alienated into nations delimited by specific geographical boundaries, thus sharing same social, cultural and political ideology. Members of a specific nation forming national identity share collective identity.

== Mental structure ==
Mental structure in psychology, which in many cases is famously called cognitive structures are usually systematized array of behaviors or thoughts in an individual forming a structure of predetermined ideas or a system of recognizing and establishing new information. They are the simple mental procedures that individuals use to discern an information. In determining the roles National Identification play in an individual's mental structure, three interdependent categories of mental structures emerge as discussed in the subsequent paragraphs.

=== Comparative thinking ===
National identification influences the Comparative thinking structures of a specific group of people. This is a mental structure where one identifies the similarity and perception of a given set of information differently as compared to a dissimilar group of people, nation. People of a specific nation memorize, recognize and classify information differently from another nation because of their differential socio-cultural and political understanding and upbringing. This is a type of mental structure, which is inculcated into the population through early learning from childhood until adulthood. Like in the case of modern wars and conflicts happening everywhere, there is an influx of refugee immigration, therefore, diverse mental thinking exists between the immigrants and the natives. The citizens of the host countries hold specific stereotypic ideas towards the refugees in relation to their countries of origin and their national identities. The refugees likewise, possess some preconceived ideas and information about their hosts. Therefore, we find out that national identity has influenced the difference in the mental structure and thinking in most cases resulting to suspicion towards a group of people.

=== Symbolic representation ===
Another way in which national identity influences mental structure is through Symbolic representation structures. This is a type of cognitive structure where a piece of information is transformed into coding systems that are culturally acceptable to a specific group of people sharing a common national identity. The cultural behaviors usually consist of both nonverbal and verbal communication practices. Listening to certain types of music, participating in unique sporting activities and possessing a distinct accent that is only exclusive to a certain nation. A people who share a common national identity, usually have unique nonverbal cues and gestures to communicate a particular message which they want to remain secretive. Certain symbols like a national flag is a sure form of national identity that shapes people's mental structures. A national flag predisposes an individual to have a sense of patriotism and dominance over other nations. Whenever a national flag belonging to a super power is hoisted or the national anthem is sung, people generally relate it to power and dominance. This ideology is stuck in their minds and it influences their mental structures symbolically.

=== Logical reasoning ===
National identification plays a role in Logical reasoning structures. This is a type of mental structure, whereby abstract thinking strategies are employed in generating and processing pieces of information systematically through inductive and deductive reasoning. It entails using both hypothetical and analogical thinking in problem framing and solving. In shaping their mental structure, people from the developed world are usually considered to solve problems through deductive reasoning. The western nations are identical to modern and advanced technologies thus their reasoning is premised on conclusive inferences, which are true and scientifically proven and they rarely have mythological thoughts. This is the converse to the nations, which are classified as underdeveloped where the citizens’ mental structures are majorly drawn from inductive reasoning pegging on predictions through past-observed patterns.
