= Identity performance =

How persons present themselves in social interactions

Identity performance is a concept that holds that "identity" can be a project or a conscious effort or action taken to present oneself in social interactions. This is based on the definition of identity as an ongoing process of self-definition and the definitions of the self by others, which emerge from interaction with others. The idea is that there are identities that are performed to achieve several objectives such as assimilation and acculturation, among others. It draws from the Erving Goffman's theatrical metaphor theory where, in social situations, the others perform the role of the audience, which an individual must perform to impress.

== Concept ==
In everyday interactions, the body serves as a critical site of identity performance. In conveying who we are to other people, we use our bodies to project information about ourselves. This is done through movement, clothing, speech, and facial expressions. What we put forward is our best effort at what we want to say about who we are. Yet, while we intend to convey one impression, our performance is not always interpreted as we might expect. Through learning to make sense of others’ responses to our behavior, we can assess how well we have conveyed what we intended. We can then alter our performance accordingly. This process of performance, interpretation, and adjustment is what Goffman calls impression management. Impression management is a part of a larger process where people seek to define a situation through their behavior. People seek to define social situations by using contextual cues from the environment around them. Social norms emerge from situational definitions, as people learn to read social cues from the environment and the people present to understand what is considered appropriate behavior.

Learning how to manage impressions is a critical social skill that is honed through experience. Over time, we learn how to make meaning out of a situation, others’ reactions, and what we are projecting of ourselves. As children, we learn that actions on our part prompt reactions by adults; as we grow older, we learn to interpret these reactions and adjust our behavior. Diverse social environments help people develop these skills because they force individuals to re-evaluate the signals they take for granted.

The process of learning to read social cues and react accordingly is core to being socialized into a society. While the process begins at home for young children, it is critical for young people to engage in social settings outside the home to develop these skills. The ways that children are taught about situations and impression management varies greatly by culture, but these processes are commonly seen as part of coming of age. While no one is ever a true master of impression management, the teenage years are a common time when people use their experiences to develop these skills.

In mediated environments, bodies are not immediately visible and the skills people need to interpret situations and manage impressions are different. As Jenny Sundén argues, people must learn to write themselves into being. Doing so makes visible how much we take the body for granted. While text, images, audio, and video all provide valuable means for developing a virtual presence, the act of articulation differs from how we convey meaningful information through our bodies. This process also makes explicit the self-reflexivity that Giddens argues is necessary for identity formation, but the choices individuals make in crafting a digital body highlight the self-monitoring that Foucault so sinisterly notes.

In some sense, people have more control online – they are able to carefully choose what information to put forward, thereby eliminating visceral reactions that might have seeped out in everyday communication. At the same time, digital bodies are fundamentally coarser, making it far easier to misinterpret what someone is expressing. Furthermore, as Amy Bruckman shows, key information about a person's body is often present online, even when that person is trying to act deceptively; for example, people are relatively good at detecting when someone is a man even when they profess to be a woman. Yet, because mediated environments reveal different signals, the mechanisms of deception differ.

== Examples ==
There are studies that reveal specific cases of identity performance. These include the investigation on the experiences of Latino students in the American public education system. It was found that within culturally coded classrooms, members of this ethnic group are expected to perform identity in the form of behavioral signal that they are just as worthy of achievement as their white peers. This also underscored that the white identity serves as the standard, and that the performances often emulated it so that they form part of the how individuals from different ethnic groups assimilate. The "public performances" enacted by black females, such as the assumption of the role of the "black vixen", are also cases of this phenomenon. Researchers cite that roles are performed to reenact, reimagine, and even revise personal and collective history.

== See also ==
- Dignity
- Workism
- Self-esteem
- Social defeat
- Social mobility
- Social rejection
- Division of labour
- Economic mobility
- Achievement ideology
- Winner and loser culture
- Social comparison theory
- Keeping up with the Joneses
