= James Marcia =

Canadian clinical psychologist

- Born: February 10, 1937 (age 89); Cleveland, Ohio
- Education: Ohio State University
- Occupation: Psychologist

James E. Marcia (born February 10, 1937) is a developmental psychologist. He taught at Simon Fraser University in British Columbia, Canada and the State University of New York at Buffalo in Upstate New York.

He is also active in clinical private practice, clinical psychology supervision, community consultation, and international clinical-developmental research and teaching.

== Early life and education ==
Marcia was born in a middle-class family on February 10, 1937, in Cleveland, Ohio, and spent his childhood in Columbus, Ohio. He grew up practicing tennis, drama, speech, and music. Marcia explored different subjects including history, English, and philosophy, and he graduated in 1959 with a bachelor's degree in psychology from Wittenberg University in Springfield, Ohio. He also received a master's and a doctoral degree in 1965 from Ohio State University in clinical psychology.

Marcia began his professional career in 1965 as a professor and director of the psychology clinic at the University at Buffalo. In 1972, he began work at Simon Fraser University where he taught for 30 years before retiring. At Simon Fraser University, he established their first clinical psychology center, offering both training and supervision opportunities for graduate students as well as clinical services to the public. Although research, teaching, and community psychology were major commitments, he also attended the University of British Columbia School of Music from 1995 to 1998 for performance in trombone. After his retirement, Dr. Marcia continues to maintain a private clinical practice. He has continued music, playing the bass and tenor trombone with symphony orchestras and bands in Vancouver.

== Ego-identity status ==
James Marcia is perhaps best known for his extensive research and writings on psychological development, with specific attention focused on adolescent psychosocial development and lifespan identity development. Erik H. Erikson had suggested that the normative conflict occurring in adolescence is the opposition between identity achievement and role confusion, which is Erikson's fifth stage of psychosocial development. Marcia elaborated on Erikson's proposal in a citation classic by suggesting this stage consists neither of identity resolution nor identity confusion as Erikson claimed, but is better understood as the extent to which one has both explored and committed to an identity in a variety of life domains including politics, occupation, religion, intimate relationships, friendships, and gender roles. 'Two crucial areas in which the adolescent must make such commitments are ideology and occupation'.

His theory of identity achievement states that there are two distinct parts contributing to the achievement of adolescent identity: a time of choosing or crisis, and a commitment. He defined a crisis as a time of upheaval where old values or choices are being reexamined and new alternatives are explored - 'times during adolescence when the individual seems to be actively involved in choosing among alternative occupations and beliefs'. Both exploration and commitment are the two processes that contribute to differences in outcome during an Identity crisis. That is, whether or not (the extent to which) one explores identity alternatives and whether or not one makes a commitment to chosen alternatives.

== The four identity statuses ==
Marcia developed the Identity Status Interview, a method of semi-structured interview for psychological identity research, that investigates an individual's extent of exploration and commitment across different life areas. Evaluating the material provided in this interview by using a scoring manual developed by Marcia and colleagues yields four possible outcomes.

The four identity statuses he distinguished were: foreclosure, identity diffusion, moratorium, and identity achievement.

=== Foreclosure ===
"The foreclosure status is when a commitment is made without exploring alternatives. Often these commitments are based on parental ideas and beliefs that are accepted without question". As Marcia himself put it, "the individual about to become a Methodist, Republican farmer like his Methodist, Republican farmer father, with little or no thought in the matter, certainly cannot be said to have "achieved" an identity, in spite of his commitment".

Adolescents may foreclose on the handed-down identity willingly or under pressure. The case of "negative-identity" occurs when adolescents adopt an identity in direct opposition to a prescribed identity. Marcia saw the evidence for the endorsement of authoritarian values by foreclosures as fully commensurate with a view of them as becoming the alter egos of their parents.

Marcia stressed that once an identity crisis has been experienced, returning to the foreclosure status was no longer a possibility.

=== Identity diffusion ===
Adolescents who struggle with identity development may avoid exploration and commitments, leading to identity diffusion. This least mature identity status indicates a lack of exploration and commitments in crucial life areas. This state, often accompanied by existential dread and confusion (identity crisis), can result in social isolation.

Marcia suggested that those with identity diffusion "do not experience much anxiety because there is little in which they are invested. As they begin to care more...they move to the moratorium status, or they become so disturbed that they are diagnosed schizophrenic"; or may end up adopting a negative and self-destructive identity-role.

=== Moratorium ===
Identity moratorium is the status of individuals who are in the midst of a crisis, whose commitments are either absent or are only vaguely defined, but who are actively exploring alternatives. Marcia notes that "moratoriums...report experiencing more anxiety than do students in any other status...The world for them is not, currently, a highly predictable place; they are vitally engaged in a struggle to make it so".

Despite such anxiety, the postmodern trend has been for more people to spend more time in the status, a phenomenon Gail Sheehy termed Provisional Adulthood. Similarly, Jeffrey Arnett's Emerging Adulthood has, as a major facet of it, identity exploration, which shares many attributes with identity moratorium.

=== Identity achievement ===
Once a crisis has been experienced and worked through, Marcia considered, "a likely progression would be from diffusion through moratorium to identity achievement". The latter is thus the status of individuals who have typically experienced a crisis, undergone identity explorations, and made commitments. Marcia found some evidence to support his "theoretical description of Students who have achieved an identity as having developed an internal, as opposed to external, locus of self-definition".

== Identity status shifts ==
Throughout the life cycle identity status, shifts will occur. When identity status change occurs (in late adolescence and young adulthood) the change is more than twice as likely to be progressive as opposed to regressive. Longitudinally status change is most often a transition from moratorium to identity achievement.

Transitions are often inspired by disequilibrium in identity. Marcia outlines how status change occurs as it relates to disequilibrium. Identity crisis comes in the form of later adult life cycle stages and various life events. Depending on the individual, particular life events such as the death of a loved one, job loss, moving, etc. may cause disequilibrium. However, this is only true when an individual has constructed some form of identity. Diffusions are stagnant. They have not made an effort to construct an identity and therefore have no identity to reform. In the case of foreclosures, many will choose to live in an environment that is similar to their childhood experiences so that they may remain unchanged. When disequilibrium occurs in the life of foreclosures, the effects may be especially devastating.

When disequilibrium occurs a period of re-construction begins. These periods of re-construction are called the moratorium-achievement-moratorium-achievement (MAMA) cycles. In each person's life, there are a minimum of three MAMA cycles, corresponding with the three remaining psychosocial stages. During re-construction, a person may regress to an earlier identity status. It is crucial that old constructs fall so that new ones that are more encompassing of the person's identity may be constructed. In the re-construction process, there is still continuity with previous identity, however, the newer construction is broadened to include new life experiences and commitments.

== Applicability and criticism ==
While Marcia primarily focused on the late adolescent years, his theory is applicable in later adulthood, when identity crises may reoccur. One study, exploring correlations between the identity statuses of Marcia's model and social behaviors, focused on young adults ranging in age from 19 to 35. People's identity status is not specifically limited to an age group. Individuals may explore elements tied to their identities throughout life, such as faith, ideology, and occupational preference to name a few.

Using Marcia's semi-structured interview approach enables research to be flexibly adapted to different cultures. There has been a good deal of cross-cultural validation of the Identity Statuses.

However, some research has suggested that the four statuses do not operate in a developmental sequence. It has been further criticized that conscious exploration is not required for and often does not occur in identity achievement. Additionally, numerous studies conducted in support of the statuses seem to focus less on developmental issues and more on classification issues (Cote 2006)'.

== See also ==
- Identity in psychology
- Role engulfment
