= Wishful identification =

Wishful identification is the extension of identification, which refers to people’s desire to become or to act in the same way as a certain media character. The majority of research about wishful identification has focused on its impacts on media users’ intimate relationships with, attachment to, identification with, imitation of, or interaction with media figures. From this perspective, research into effects of wishful identification are helpful to understand how mediated messages can be effectively conveyed, and how mediated behaviors and figures can be shaped to positively influence social attitudes and behaviors.

Participants in relevant research primarily consist of children and adolescents, as they do not have significant life and social experience. They have greater needs than adults for role models so that they as children may develop and adjust their own social behaviors. As mentioned by Comstock, “television is a catalogue of modes of behavior; whether they affect what viewers do depends on their being taken as rewarding, acceptable, and applicable”(p. 128).

== Wishful identification versus identification ==
There has been some inconsistency in the definition of identification. Some researchers define identification as hoping to be a certain media figure, to be in a certain mediated situation of that media figure, or to act a similar way to that media figure. However, this definition is not applied as widely as the one introduced by Cohen (2001): “a mechanism through which audience members experience reception and interpretation of the text from the inside, as if the events were happening to them.” While identification is characterized as sharing media figures’ points of view, vicarious participation, and imaginability, wishful identification focuses on media users’ desire and tendency.

== Wishful identification and perceived similarity ==
Perceived similarity is found to be a significant predictor of wishful identification. Perceived similarity can predict not only media users’ desire to be a certain media character, but also the level of that desire.

== Imitation ==
In early research and some recent research, imitation is an interchangeable word for wishful identification. Hoffner defines imitation as a “desire to be like or behave in ways similar to a character” (p. 19). However, the limitation of this conceptualization is that the essence of wishful identification is media users’ desire, but imitation is not about people’s expectations; rather, it is about modeling, either for identity or for behavior. While wishful identification implies anything but an actual emulating action, the best nature of imitation is action.
