= Identity formation =

Process in which humans develop a view of themselves and of their identity

Identity formation, also called identity development or identity construction, is a complex process in which humans develop a clear and unique view of themselves and of their identity.

Self-concept, personality development, and values are all closely related to identity formation. Individuation is also a critical part of identity formation. Continuity and inner unity are healthy identity formation, while a disruption in either could be viewed and labeled as abnormal development; certain situations, like childhood trauma, can contribute to abnormal development. Specific factors also play a role in identity formation, such as race, ethnicity, and spirituality.

The concept of personal continuity, or personal identity, refers to an individual posing questions about themselves that challenge their original perception, like "Who am I?" The process defines individuals to others and themselves. Various factors make up a person's actual identity, including a sense of continuity, a sense of uniqueness from others, and a sense of affiliation based on their membership in various groups like family, ethnicity, and occupation. These group identities demonstrate the human need for affiliation or for people to define themselves in the eyes of others and themselves.

Identities are formed on many levels. The micro-level is self-definition, relations with people, and issues as seen from a personal or an individual perspective. The meso-level pertains to how identities are viewed, formed, and questioned by immediate communities and/or families. The macro-level are the connections among and individuals and issues from a national perspective. The global level connects individuals, issues, and groups at a worldwide level.

Identity is often described as finite and consisting of separate and distinct parts (e.g., family, cultural, personal, professional).

== Theories ==
Many theories of development have aspects of identity formation included in them. Two theories directly address the process of identity formation: Erik Erikson's stages of psychosocial development (specifically the Identity versus Role Confusion stage), James Marcia's identity status theory, and Jeffrey Arnett's theories of identity formation in emerging adulthood.

=== Erikson's theory of identity vs. role confusion ===
Erikson's theory is that people experience different crises or conflicts throughout their lives in eight stages. Each stage occurs at a certain point in life and must be successfully resolved to progress to the next stage. The particular stage relevant to identity formation takes place during adolescence: Identity versus Role Confusion.

The Identity versus Role Confusion stage involves adolescents trying to figure out who they are in order to form a basic identity that they will build on throughout their life, especially concerning social and occupational identities. They ask themselves the existential questions: "Who am I?" and "What can I be?" They face the complexities of determining one's own identity. Erikson stated that this crisis is resolved with identity achievement, the point at which an individual has extensively considered various goals and values, accepting some and rejecting others, and understands who they are as a unique person. When an adolescent attains identity achievement, they are ready to enter the next stage of Erikson's theory, Intimacy versus Isolation, where they will form strong friendships and a sense of companionship with others.

If the Identity versus Role Confusion crisis is not positively resolved, an adolescent will face confusion about future plans, particularly their roles in adulthood. Failure to form one's own identity leads to failure to form a shared identity with others, which can lead to instability in many areas as an adult. The identity formation stage of Erik Erikson's theory of psychosocial development is a crucial stage in life.

=== Marcia's identity status theory ===
Marcia created a structural interview designed to classify adolescents into one of four statuses of identity. The statuses are used to describe and pinpoint the progression of an adolescent's identity formation process. In Marcia's theory, identity is operationally defined as whether an individual has explored various alternatives and made firm commitments to an occupation, religion, sexual orientation, and a set of political values.

The four identity statuses in James Marcia's theory are:

1. Identity Diffusion (also known as Role Confusion): The opposite of identity achievement. The individual has not resolved their identity crisis yet by failing to commit to any goals or values and establish a future life direction. In adolescents, this stage is characterized by disorganized thinking, procrastination, and avoidance of issues and actions.
2. Identity Foreclosure: This occurs when teenagers conform to an identity without exploring what suits them best. For instance, teenagers might follow the values and roles of their parents or cultural norms. They might also foreclose on a negative identity, or the direct opposite of their parents' values or cultural norms.
3. Identity Moratorium: This postpones identity achievement by providing temporary shelter. This status provides opportunities for exploration, either in breadth or in-depth. Examples of moratoria common in American society include college or the military.
4. Identity Achievement: This status is attained when the person has solved the identity issues by making commitments to goals, beliefs, and values after an extensive exploration of different areas.

=== Jeffrey Arnett's Theories on Identity Formation in Emerging Adulthood ===
Jeffrey Arnett's theory states that identity formation is most prominent in emerging adulthood, consisting of ages 18–25. Arnett holds that identity formation consists of indulging in different life opportunities and possibilities to eventually make important life decisions. He believes this phase of life includes a broad range of opportunities for identity formation, specifically in three different realms.

These three realms of identity exploration are:

1. Love: In emerging adulthood, individuals explore love to find a profound sense of intimacy. While trying to find love, individuals often explore their identity by focusing on questions such as: "Given the kind of person I am, what kind of person do I wish to have as a partner through life?"
2. Work: Work opportunities that people get involved in are now centered around the idea that they are preparing for careers that they might have throughout adulthood. Individuals explore their identity by asking themselves questions such as: "What kind of work am I good at?", "What kind of work would I find satisfying for the long term", or "What are my chance of getting a job in the field that seems to suit me best?"
3. Worldviews: It is common for those in the stage of emerging adulthood to attend college. There they may be exposed to different worldviews, compared to those they were raised in, and become open to altering their previous worldviews. Individuals who don't attend college also believe that as adult they should also decide what their beliefs and values are.

== Self-concept ==
Self-concept, or self-identity, is the set of beliefs and ideas an individual has about themselves. Self-concept is different from self-consciousness, which is an awareness of one's self. Components of the self-concept include physical, psychological, and social attributes, which can be influenced by the individual's attitudes, habits, beliefs, and ideas; they cannot be condensed into the general concepts of self-image or self-esteem. Multiple types of identity come together within an individual and can be broken down into the following: cultural identity, professional identity, ethnic and national identity, religious identity, gender identity, and disability identity.

=== Cultural identity ===
Cultural identity is formation of ideas an individual takes based on the culture they belong to. Cultural identity relates to but is not synonymous with identity politics. There are modern questions of culture that are transferred into questions of identity. Historical culture also influences individual identity, and as with modern cultural identity, individuals may pick and choose aspects of cultural identity, while rejecting or disowning other associated ideas.

=== Professional identity ===
Professional identity is the identification with a profession, exhibited by an aligning of roles, responsibilities, values, and ethical standards as accepted by the profession.

In business, professional identity is the professional self-concept that is founded upon attributes, values, and experiences. A professional identity is developed when there is a philosophy that is manifested in a distinct corporate culture – the corporate personality. A business professional is a person in a profession with certain types of skills that sometimes require formal training or education.

Career development encompasses the total dimensions of psychological, sociological, educational, physical, economic, and chance that alter a person's career practice across the lifespan. Career development also refers to the practices from a company or organization that enhance someone's career or encourages them to make practical career choices.

Training is a form of identity setting, since it not only affects knowledge but also affects a team member's self-concept. On the other hand, knowledge of the position introduces a new path of less effort to the trainee, which prolongs the effects of training and promotes a stronger self-concept. Other forms of identity setting in an organization include Business Cards, Specific Benefits by Role, and Task Forwarding.

=== Ethnic and national identity ===
An ethnic identity is an identification with a certain ethnicity, usually on the basis of a presumed common genealogy or ancestry. Recognition by others as a distinct ethnic group is often a contributing factor to developing this identity. Ethnic groups are also often united by common cultural, behavioral, linguistic, ritualistic, or religious traits.

Processes that result in the emergence of such identification are summarized as ethnogenesis. Various cultural studies and social theory investigate the question of cultural and ethnic identities. Cultural identity adheres to location, gender, race, history, nationality, sexual orientation, religious beliefs, and ethnicity.

National identity is an ethical and philosophical concept where all humans are divided into groups called nations. Members of a "nation" share a common identity and usually a common origin, in the sense of ancestry, parentage, or descent.

=== Religious identity ===
A religious identity is the set of beliefs and practices generally held by an individual, involving adherence to codified beliefs and rituals and study of ancestral or cultural traditions, writings, history, mythology, and faith and mystical experience. Religious identity refers to the personal practices related to communal faith along with rituals and communication stemming from such conviction. This identity formation begins with an association in the parents' religious contacts, and individuation requires that the person chooses the same or different religious identity than that of their parents.

=== Gender identity ===
In sociology, gender identity describes the gender with which a person identifies (i.e., whether one perceives oneself to be a man, a woman, outside of the gender binary), but can also be used to refer to the gender that other people attribute to the individual on the basis of what they know from gender role indications (social behavior, clothing, hairstyle, etc.). Gender identity may be affected by a variety of social structures, including the person's ethnic group, employment status, religion or irreligion, and family. It can also be biological in the sense of puberty.

=== Disability identity ===
Disability identity refers to the particular disabilities that an individual identifies with. This may be something as obvious as a paraplegic person identifying as such, or something less prominent such as a deaf person regarding themselves as part of a local, national, or global community of Deaf People Culture.

Disability identity is almost always determined by the particular disabilities that an individual is born with, though it may change later in life if an individual later becomes disabled or when an individual later discovers a previously overlooked disability (particularly applicable to mental disorders). In some rare cases, it may be influenced by exposure to disabled people as with body integrity dysphoria.

=== Political identity ===
Political identities often form the basis of public claims and mobilization of material and other resources for collective action. One theory that explores how this occurs is social movement theory. According to Charles Tilly, the interpretation of our relationship to others ("stories") create the rationale and construct of political identity. The capacity for action is constrained by material resources and sometimes perceptions that can be manipulated by using communication strategies that support the creation of illusory ties.

== Interpersonal identity development ==
Interpersonal identity development comes from Marcia's Identity Status Theory, and refers to friendship, dating, gender roles, and recreation as tools to maturity in a psychosocial aspect of an individual.

Social relation can refer to a multitude of social interactions regulated by social norms between two or more people, with each having a social position and performing a social role. In a sociological hierarchy, social relation is more advanced than behavior, action, social behavior, social action, social contact, and social interaction. It forms the basis of concepts like social organization, social structure, social movement, and social system.

Interpersonal identity development is composed of three elements:

- Categorization: Assigning everyone into categories.
- Identification: Associating others with certain groups.
- Comparison: Comparing groups.

Interpersonal identity development allows an individual to question and examine various personality elements, such as ideas, beliefs, and behaviors. The actions or thoughts of others create social influences that change an individual. Examples of social influence can be seen in socialization and peer pressure, which can affect a person's behavior, thinking about one's self, and subsequent acceptance or rejection of how other people attempt to influence the individual. Interpersonal identity development occurs during exploratory self-analysis and self-evaluation, and ends at various times to establish an easy-to-understand and consolidative sense of self or identity.

=== Collective identity ===
Collective identity is a sense of belonging to a group (the collective). If it is strong, an individual who identifies with the group will dedicate their lives to the group over individual identity: they will defend the views of the group and take risks for the group, often with little to no incentive or coercion. Collective identity often forms through a shared sense of interest, affiliation, or adversity. The cohesiveness of the collective identity goes beyond the community, as the collective experiences grief from the loss of a member.

=== Social support ===
Individuals gain a social identity and group identity from their affiliations in various groups, which include: family, ethnicity, education and occupational status, friendship, dating, and religion.

==== Family ====
One of the most important affiliations is that of the family, whether they be biological, extended, or even adoptive families. Each has its own influence on identity through the interaction that takes place between the family members and with the individual. Researchers and theorists state that an individual's identity (more specifically an adolescent's identity) is influenced by the people around them and the environment in which they live. If a family does not have integration, it is likely to cause identity diffusion (one of James Marcia's four identity statuses, where an individual has not made commitments and does not try to make them), and applies to both males and females.

==== Peer relationships ====
Morgan and Korobov performed a study in order to analyze the influence of same-sex friendships in the development of one's identity. This study involved the use of 24 same-sex college student friendship triads, consisting of 12 males and 12 females, with a total of 72 participants. Each triad was required to have known each other for a minimum of six months. A qualitative method was chosen, as it is the most appropriate in assessing the development of identity. Semi-structured group interviews took place, where the students were asked to reflect on stories and experiences concerning relationship problems. The results showed five common responses when assessing these relationship problems: joking about the relationship's problems, providing support, offering advice, relating others' experiences to their own similar experiences, and providing encouragement. The results concluded that adolescents actively construct their identities through common themes of conversation between same-sex friendships; in this case, involving relationship issues. The common themes of conversation that close peers seem to engage in helping to further their identity formation in life.

== Influences on identity ==
=== Cognitive influences ===
Cognitive development influences identity formation. When adolescents are able to think abstractly and reason logically, they have an easier time exploring, reflecting, and contemplating possible identities. When an adolescent has advanced cognitive development and maturity, they tend to have the motivation to resolve identity issues more so than age mates that are less cognitively developed. When identity issues are solved cognitively, there is more time and effort put into developing that identity.

=== Scholastic influences ===
Adolescents that have a post-secondary education tend to make more concrete goals and stable occupational commitments. Going to college or university can influence identity formation in a productive way. The opposite can also be true, where identity influences education and academics. Education's effect on identity can be beneficial for the individual's identity; the individual becomes educated on different approaches and paths to take in the process of identity formation.

=== Sociocultural influences ===
Sociocultural influences are those of a broader social and historical context. For example, in the past, adolescents would likely just adopt the job or religious beliefs that were expected of them or that were akin to their parents. Today, adolescents have more resources to explore identity choices and more options for commitments. This influence is becoming less significant due to the growing acceptance of identity options that were once less accepted. Many of the identity options from the past are becoming unrecognized and less popular today. The changing sociocultural situation is forcing individuals to develop a unique identity based on their own aspirations. Sociocultural influences play a different role in identity formation now than they have in the past.

=== Parenting influences ===
The type of relationship that adolescents have with their parents has a significant role in identity formation. For example, when there is a solid and positive relationship between parents and adolescents, they are more likely to feel freedom in exploring identity options for themselves. A study found that for boys and girls, identity formation is positively influenced by parental involvement, specifically in the areas of support, social monitoring, and school monitoring. In contrast, when the relationship is not as close and the fear of rejection or discontentment from the parent or other guardians is present, they are more likely to feel less confident in forming a separate identity from their parents.

=== Cyber-socializing and the Internet ===
The Internet is becoming an extension of the expressive dimension of adolescence. On the Internet, youth talk about their lives and concerns, design the content that they make available to others, and assess the reactions of others to it in the form of optimized and electronically mediated social approval. When connected, youth speak of their daily routines and lives. With each post, image or video they upload, they can ask themselves who they are and try out profiles that differ from the ones they practice in the "real" world.

== See also ==
- Otium
- Poverty
- Workism
- Self-Schema
- Social theory
- Social defeat
- Lev Vygotsky
- Social stigma
- Social identity
- Self-discovery
- Peer pressure
- Cultural identity
- Erving Goffman
- Religious Values
- Consumer culture
- Moral development
- Identity disturbance
- Identity performance
- Wishful identification
- George Herbert Mead
- In-group and out-group
- Symbolic interactionism
- Social comparison theory
- Identification (psychology)
- Identity crisis (psychology)
- Genealogical bewilderment
- Values (Western philosophy)
- True self and false self
- Georg Wilhelm Friedrich Hegel
