= Wickland =

Wickland may refer to:

== Places ==
- Wickland (Bardstown, Kentucky), USA, built 1815
- Wickland (Shelbyville, Kentucky), USA, built 1901

== People ==
- Al Wickland (1888–1980), American baseball player
- Carl Wickland (1861–1945), Swedish-American paranormal researcher
