= Carl Wickland =

Swedish-American psychiatrist and psychical researcher

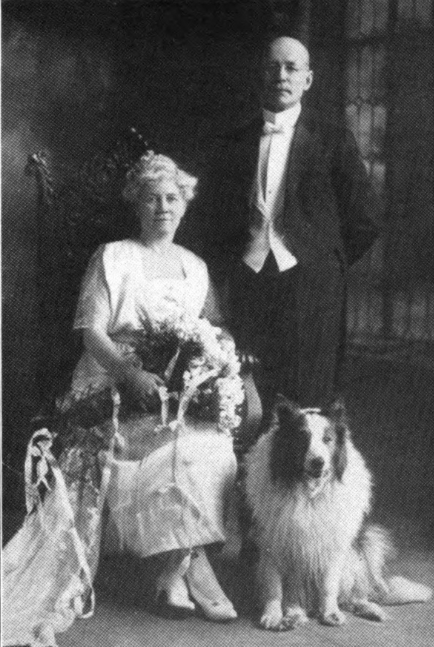
- Born: 14 February 1861
- Died: 13 November 1945 (aged 84)
- Education: Durham Medical College
- Occupations: Writer, psychiatrist
- Writing career
- Period: 20th century
- Genre: Parapsychology

Carl August Wickland (born Carl August Wicklund, 14 February 1861 – 13 November 1945) was a 20th-century Swedish-American psychiatrist and psychical researcher.

== Life and career ==
Carl Wickland (Wiklund) was born in 1861 at Liden, Sweden, to Anders Wiklund and Ingrid Brita Nilsdotter, and was one of nine siblings.

According to Wickland, he emigrated from Sweden to Saint Paul, Minnesota, married Anna W. Anderson and moved to Chicago, graduating from Durham Medical College in 1900. Wickland's own autobiographical sketch lists accomplishments as a general practitioner of medicine, member of the Chicago Medical Society and the American Association for the Advancement of Science, and chief psychiatrist at the State Psychopathic Institute of Chicago.

Anna Wickland died on 3 March 1937, after a nine-month illness. Carl Wickland died in 1945, at the age of 84. Wing Anderson, an author of material dealing with sleep suggestion therapy for the correction of psychosomatic ills, purchased the copyrights to both of Wickland's books.

== Psychical researcher ==
Wickland turned away from conventional medical psychology and toward the belief that psychiatric illnesses were the result of influence by spirits of the dead. Wickland came to believe that a large number of his patients had become possessed by what he called "obsessing spirits", and that low-voltage electric shocks could dislodge them, while his wife Anna acted as a medium to guide them to "progress in the spirit world". Spiritualists considered him an authority on "destructive spirits" and he wrote a book in 1924, Thirty Years Among the Dead, detailing his experiences as a psychical researcher.

Wickland was convinced that he was in contact with a group of spirits known as the "Mercy Band" who would remove the possessors, and help them in the spirit world. Psychologist Robert A. Baker listed Wickland and Arthur Guirdham as early psychiatrists who preferred to "ignore the science and embrace the supernatural".

Wickland founded the National Psychological Institute in Los Angeles, California, to study psychic phenomena. A letter published in a 1918 issue of the journal Science criticized the institute's promotion of psychic research "under the name of psychology" as an example of "pseudo-psychology", adding that "the use of such a name involves bad taste and delusion".

== Publications ==
- Thirty Years Among the Dead (1924)
- The Gateway of Understanding (1934)
