= Social stress =

Type of psychological stress

Social stress is stress that stems from one's relationships with others and from the social environment in general. Based on the appraisal theory of emotion, stress arises when a person evaluates a situation as personally relevant and perceives that they do not have the resources to cope or handle the specific situation.

The activation of social stress does not necessarily have to occur linked to a specific event, the mere idea that the event may occur could trigger it. This means that any element that takes a subject out of their personal and intimate environment could become a stressful experience. This situation makes them socially incompetent individuals.

There are three main categories of social stressors. Life events are defined as abrupt, severe life changes that require an individual to adapt quickly (ex. sexual assault, sudden injury). Chronic strains are defined as persistent events which require an individual to make adaptations over an extended period of time (ex. divorce, unemployment). Daily hassles are defined as minor events that occur, which require adaptation throughout the day (ex. bad traffic, disagreements). When stress becomes chronic, one experiences emotional, behavioral, and physiological changes that can put one under greater risk for developing a mental disorder and physical illness.

Humans are social beings by nature, as they typically have a fundamental need and desire to maintain positive social relationships. Thus, they usually find maintaining positive social ties to be beneficial. Social relationships can offer nurturance, foster feelings of social inclusion, and lead to reproductive success. Anything that disrupts or threatens to disrupt their relationships with others can result in social stress. This can include low social status in society or in particular groups, giving a speech, interviewing with potential employers, caring for a child or spouse with a chronic illness, meeting new people at a party, the threat of or actual death of a loved one, divorce, and discrimination. Social stress can arise from one's micro-environment (e.g., family ties) and macro-environment (e.g., hierarchical societal structure). Social stress is typically the most frequent type of stressor that people experience in their daily lives and affects people more intensely than other types of stressors.

== Definitions ==
Researchers define social stress and social stressors in various ways. Wadman, Durkin, and Conti-Ramsden (2011) defined social stress as "the feelings of discomfort or anxiety that individuals may experience in social situations, and the associated tendency to avoid potentially stressful social situations". Ilfield (1977) defined social stressors as "circumstances of daily social roles that are generally considered problematic or undesirable". Dormann and Zapf (2004) defined social stressors as "a class of characteristics, situations, episodes, or behaviors that are related to psychological or physical strain and that are somehow social in nature".

== Measurement ==
Social stress is typically measured through self-report questionnaires. In the laboratory, researchers can induce social stress through various methods and protocols.

=== Self-reports ===
There are several questionnaires used to assess environmental and psychosocial stress. Such self-report measures include the Test of Negative Social Exchange, the Marital Adjustment Test, the Risky Families Questionnaire, the Holmes–Rahe Stress Inventory, the Trier Inventory for the Assessment of Chronic Stress, the Daily Stress Inventory, the Job Content Questionnaire, the Perceived Stress Scale, and the Stress and Adversity Inventory.

In addition to self-report questionnaires, researchers can employ structured interview assessments. The Life Events and Difficulties Schedule (LEDS) is one of the most popular instruments used in research. The purpose of this type of measure is to probe the participant to elaborate on their stressful life events, rather than answering singular questions. The UCLA Life Stress Interview (LSI), which is similar to the LEDS, includes questions about romantic partners, closest friendships, other friendships, and family relationships.

=== Induction ===
In rodent models, social disruption and social defeat are two common social stress paradigms. In the social disruption paradigm, an aggressive rodent is introduced into a cage housing male rodents that have already naturally established a social hierarchy. The aggressive "intruder" disrupts the social hierarchy, causing the residents social stress. In the social defeat paradigm, an aggressive "intruder" and another non-aggressive male rodent fight.

In human research, the Trier Social Stress Task (TSST) is widely used to induce social stress in the laboratory. In the TSST, participants are told that they have to prepare and give a speech about why they would be a great candidate for their ideal job. The experimenter films the participant while they give the speech and informs the participant that a panel of judges will evaluate that speech. After the public speaking component, the experimenter administers a mathematics task that involves counting backwards by certain increments. If the participant makes a mistake, the experimenter prompts them to start again. The threat of negative evaluation is the social stressor. Researchers can measure the stress response by comparing pre-stress salivary cortisol levels and post-stress salivary cortisol levels. Other common stress measures used in the TSST are self-report measures like the State-Trait Anxiety Inventory and physiological measures like heart rate.

In a laboratory conflict discussion, couples identify several specific areas of conflict in their relationship. The couples then pinpoint a couple topics to discuss later on in the experiment (ex. finances, child-rearing). Couples are told to discuss the conflict(s) for 10 minutes while being videotaped.

Brouwer and Hogervorst (2014) designed the Sing-a-Song Stress Test (SSST) to induce stress in the laboratory setting. After viewing neutral images with subsequent 1-minute rest periods, the participant is instructed to sing a song after the next 1-minute rest period is complete. Researchers found that skin conductance and heart rate are significantly higher during the post-song message interval than the previous 1-minute intervals. The stress levels are comparable to that induced in the Trier Social Stress Task. In 2020, a systematic review about the TSST provided several guidelines to standardize the use of the TSST across studies

=== Statistical indicators of stress in large groups ===
A statistical indicator of stress, simultaneous increase of variance and correlations, was proposed for diagnosis of stress and successfully used in physiology and finance. Its applicability for early diagnosis of social stress in large groups was demonstrated by the analysis of crises. It was examined in the prolonged stress period preceding the 2014 Ukrainian economic and political crisis. There was a simultaneous increase in the total correlation between the 19 major public fears in the Ukrainian society (by about 64%) and also in their statistical dispersion (by 29%) during the pre-crisis years.

== Mental health ==
Research has consistently demonstrated that social stress increases risk for developing negative mental health outcomes. One prospective study asked over fifteen hundred Finnish employees whether they had "considerable difficulties with [their] coworkers/superiors/inferiors during the last 6 months, 5 years, earlier, or never". Information on suicides, hospitalizations due to psychosis, suicidal behavior, alcohol intoxication, depressive symptoms, and medication for chronic psychiatric disorders was then gathered from the national registries of mortality and morbidity. Those who had experienced conflict in the workplace with coworkers or supervisors in the last five years were more likely to be diagnosed with a psychiatric condition.

Research on the LGBT population has suggested that people who identify as LGBT suffer more from mental health disorders, such as substance abuse and mood disorders, compared to those who identify as heterosexual. Researchers deduce that the LGBT people's higher risk of mental health issues derives from their stressful social environments. Minority groups can face high levels of stigma, prejudice, and discrimination on a regular basis, therefore leading to the development of various mental health disorders.

=== Depression ===
Risk for developing clinical depression significantly increases after experiencing social stress; depressed individuals often experience interpersonal loss before becoming depressed. One study found that depressed individuals who had been rejected by others had developed depression about three times more quickly than those who had experienced stress not involving social rejection. Several studies have suggested that unemployment roughly doubles the risk of developing depression. In non-clinically depressed populations, people with friends and family who make too many demands, criticize, and create tension and conflict tend to have more depressive symptoms. Conflict between spouses leads to more psychological distress and depressive symptoms, especially for wives. In particular, unhappy married couples are 10–25 times more at risk for developing clinical depression. Similarly, social stress arising from discrimination is related to greater depressive symptoms. In one study, African-Americans and non-Hispanic whites reported on their daily experiences of discrimination and depressive symptoms. Regardless of race, those who perceived more discrimination had higher depressive symptoms. Posselt and Lipson found, in 2016, that undergraduates had a 37% higher chance of developing depression if they perceived their classroom environments as highly competitive.

=== Anxiety ===
The biological basis for anxiety disorders is rooted in the consistent activation of the stress response. Fear, which is the defining emotion of an anxiety disorder, occurs when someone perceives a situation (a stressor) as threatening. This activates the stress response. If a person has difficulty regulating this stress response, it may activate inappropriately. Stress can therefore arise when a real stressor is not present or when something isn't actually threatening. This can lead to the development of an anxiety disorder (panic attacks, social anxiety, OCD, etc.). Social anxiety disorder is defined as the fear of being judged or evaluated by others, even if no such threat is actually present.

Research shows a connection between social stress, such as traumatic life events and chronic strains, and the development of anxiety disorders. A study that examined a subpopulation of adults, both young and middle-age, found that those who had diagnosed panic disorder in adulthood also experienced sexual abuse during childhood. Children who experience social stressors, such as physical and psychological abuse, as well as parental loss, are also more at risk for developing anxiety disorders during adulthood than children who did not experience such stressors.

In 2016, an analysis of 40,350 undergraduates from 70 institutions by Posselt and Lipson found that they had a 69% higher chance of developing anxiety if they perceived their classroom environments as highly competitive.

=== Long-term effects ===
Social stress occurring early in life can have psychopathological effects that develop or persist in adulthood. One longitudinal study found that children were more likely to have a psychiatric disorder (e.g. anxiety, depressive, disruptive, personality, and substance use disorders) in late adolescence and early adulthood when their parents showed more maladaptive child-rearing behaviors (e.g., loud arguments between parents, verbal abuse, difficulty controlling anger toward the child, lack of parental support or availability, and harsh punishment). Child temperament and parental psychiatric disorders did not explain this association. Other studies have documented the robust relationships between children's social stress within the family environment and depression, aggression, antisocial behavior, anxiety, suicide, and hostile, oppositional, and delinquent behavior.

=== Relapse and recurrence ===
Social stress can also exacerbate current psychopathological conditions and compromise recovery. For instance, patients recovering from depression or bipolar disorder are two times more likely to relapse if there is familial tension. People with eating disorders are also more likely to relapse if their family members make more critical comments, are more hostile, or are over-involved. Similarly, outpatients with schizophrenia or schizoaffective disorder show greater psychotic symptoms if the most influential person in their life is critical and are more likely to relapse if their familial relationships are marked by tension.

In regard to substance abuse, cocaine-dependent individuals report greater cravings for cocaine following exposure to a social stressor. Traumatic life events and social stressors can also trigger the exacerbation of the symptoms of mental health disorders. Socially phobic children who experience a stressful event can become even more avoidant and socially inactive.

== Physical health ==
Research has also found a robust relationship between various social stressors and aspects of physical health.

=== Mortality ===
Social status, a macro-social stressor, is a robust predictor of death. In a study of over 1700 British civil servants, socioeconomic status (SES) was inversely related to mortality. Those with the lowest SES have worse health outcomes and greater mortality rates than those with the greatest SES. Other studies have replicated this relationship between SES and mortality in a range of diseases, including infectious, digestive, and respiratory diseases. A study examining the link between SES and mortality in the elderly found that education level, household income, and occupational prestige were all related to lower mortality in men. In women, however, only household income was related to lower mortality.

Similarly, social stressors in the micro-environment are also linked to increased mortality. A seminal longitudinal study of nearly 7,000 people found that socially isolated people had greater risk of dying from any cause.

Social support, which is defined as "the comfort, assistance, and/or information one receives through formal or informal contacts with individuals or groups", has been linked to physical health outcomes. Research shows the three aspects of social support, available attachments, perceived social support, and frequency of social interactions, can predict mortality thirty months after assessment.

=== Morbidity ===
Social stress also makes people more sick. People who have fewer social contacts are at greater risk for developing illness, including cardiovascular disease. The lower one's social status, the more likely he or she is to have a cardiovascular, gastrointestinal, musculoskeletal, neoplastic, pulmonary, renal, or other chronic diseases. These links are not explained by other, more traditional risk factors such as race, health behaviors, age, sex, or access to health care.

In one laboratory study, researchers interviewed participants to determine whether they had been experiencing social conflicts with spouses, close family members and friends. They then exposed the participants to the common cold virus and found that participants with conflict-ridden relationships were two times more likely to develop a cold than those without such social stress. Social support, especially in terms of support for socioeconomic stressors, is inversely related to physical morbidity. A study that investigated social determinants of health in an urban slum in India found that social exclusion, stress, and lack of social support are significantly related to illnesses, such as hypertension, coronary heart disease, and diabetes.

Students who are being bullied may show signs of depression, impaired academic achievement, impaired quality of sleep, and anxiety disorders.

=== Long-term effects ===
Exposure to social stress in childhood can also have long-term effects, increasing risk for developing diseases later in life. In particular, adults who were maltreated (emotionally, physically, sexually abused or neglected) as children report more disease outcomes, such as stroke, heart attack, diabetes, and hypertension or greater severity of those outcomes. The Adverse Childhood Experiences study (ACE), which includes over seventeen thousand adults, also found that there was a 20% increase in likelihood for experiencing heart disease for each kind of chronic familial social stressor experienced in childhood, and this was not due to typical risk factors for heart disease such as demographics, smoking, exercise, adiposity, diabetes, or hypertension.

=== Recovery and other disease ===
Social stress has also been tied to worse health outcomes among patients who already have a disease. Patients with end-stage renal disease faced a 46% increased risk for mortality when there was more relationship negativity with their spouse even when controlling for severity of disease and treatment. Similarly, women who had experienced an acute coronary event were three times more likely to experience another coronary event if they experienced moderate to severe marital strain. This finding remained even after controlling for demographics, health behaviors, and disease status.

With regard to HIV/AIDS, stress may affect the progression from the virus to the disease. Research shows the HIV-positive males who have more negative life events, social stress, and lack of social support progress to a clinical AIDS diagnosis more quickly than HIV-positive males who do not have as high levels of social stress. For HIV-positive females, who have also contracted the HSV virus, stress is a risk factor for genital herpes breakouts.

== Physiology ==
Social stress leads to a number of physiological changes that mediate its relationship to physical health. In the short term, the physiological changes outlined below are adaptive, as they enable the stressed organism to cope better. Dysregulation of these systems or repeated activation of them over the long-term can be detrimental to health.

=== Sympathetic nervous system ===
The sympathetic nervous system (SNS) becomes activated in response to stress. Sympathetic arousal stimulates the medulla of the medulla to secrete epinephrine and norepinephrine into the blood stream, which facilitates the fight-or-flight response. Blood pressure, heart rate, and sweating increase, veins constrict to allow the heart to beat with more force, arteries leading to muscles dilate, and blood flow to parts of the body not essential for the fight or flight response decreases. If stress persists in the long run, then blood pressure remains elevated, leading to hypertension and atherosclerosis, both precursors to cardiovascular disease.

A number of animal and human studies have confirmed that social stress increases risk for negative health outcomes by increasing SNS activity. Studies of rodents show that social stress causes hypertension and atherosclerosis. Studies of non-human primates also show that social stress clogs arteries. Although humans cannot be randomized to receive social stress due to ethical concerns, studies have nevertheless shown that negative social interactions characterized by conflict lead to increases in blood pressure and heart rate. Social stress stemming from perceived daily discrimination is also associated with elevated levels of blood pressure during the day and a lack of blood pressure dipping at night.

=== Hypothalamic-pituitary adrenocortical axis (HPA) ===
In response to stress, the hypothalamus releases corticotropin-releasing hormone (CRH), stimulating the anterior pituitary to release adrenocorticotropic hormone (ACTH). ACTH then stimulates the adrenal cortex to secrete glucocorticoids, including cortisol. Social stress can lead to adverse health outcomes by chronically activating the HPA axis or disrupting the HPA system. There are a number of studies that link social stress and indications of a disrupted HPA axis; for instance, monkey infants neglected by their mothers show prolonged cortisol responses following a challenging event.

In humans, abused women exhibit a prolonged elevation in cortisol following a standardized psychosocial laboratory stressor compared to those without an abuse history. Maltreated children show higher morning cortisol values than non-maltreated children. Their HPA systems also fail to recover after a stressful social interaction with their caregiver. Over time, low-SES children show progressively greater output of cortisol. Although these studies point to a disrupted HPA system accounting for the link between social stress and physical health, they did not include disease outcomes. Nevertheless, a dysfunctional HPA response to stress is thought to increase risk for developing or exacerbating diseases such as diabetes, cancer, cardiovascular disease, and hypertension.

=== Inflammation ===
Inflammation is an immune response that is critical to fighting infections and repairing injured tissue. Although acute inflammation is adaptive, chronic inflammatory activity can contribute to adverse health outcomes, such as hypertension, atherosclerosis, coronary heart disease, depression, diabetes, and some cancers.

Research has elucidated a relationship between different social stressors and cytokines (the markers of inflammation). Chronic social stressors, such as caring for a spouse with dementia, lead to greater circulating levels of cytokine interleukin-6 (IL-6), whereas acute social stress tasks in the laboratory have been shown to elicit increases in proinflammatory cytokines. Similarly, when faced with another type of social stress, namely social evaluative threat, participants showed increases in IL-6 and a soluble receptor for tumor necrosis factor-α. Increases in inflammation may persist over time, as studies have shown that chronic relationship stress has been tied to greater IL-6 production 6 months later and children reared in a stressful family environment marked by neglect and conflict tend to show elevated levels of C-reactive protein, a marker of IL-6, in adulthood.

=== Interactions of physiological systems ===
There is extensive evidence that the above physiological systems affect one another's functioning. For instance, cortisol tends to have a suppressive effect on inflammatory processes, and proinflammatory cytokines can also activate the HPA system. Sympathetic activity can also upregulate inflammatory activity. Given the relationships among these physiological systems, social stress may also influence health indirectly via affecting a particular physiological system that in turn affects a different physiological system.

== See also ==
- Displaced aggression
- Failure
- Happiness
- Harassment
- Identity performance
- Impression management
- Keeping up with the Joneses
- Peer pressure
- Rat race
- Self-concealment
- Slut-shaming
- Social defeat
- Social inequality
- Social medicine
- Social rejection
- Social stigma
- Stress (biology)
- Stress (psychological)
- Suicide in LGBT youth
- Unemployment
- Victimology
