= Religious identity =

Identity formation based on religious beliefs

Religious identity is a specific type of identity formation. Particularly, it is the sense of group membership to a religion and the importance of this group membership as it pertains to one's self-concept. Religious identity is not necessarily the same as religiousness or religiosity. Although these three terms share a commonality, religiousness and religiosity refer to both the value of religious group membership as well as participation in religious events (e.g. going to church). Religious identity, on the other hand, refers specifically to religious group membership regardless of religious activity or participation.

Similar to other forms of identity formation, such as ethnic and cultural identity, the religious context can generally provide a perspective from which to view the world, opportunities to socialize with a spectrum of individuals from different generations, and a set of basic principles to live out. These foundations can come to shape an individual's identity.

Despite the implications that religion has on identity development, the identity formation literature has mainly focused on ethnicity and gender and has largely discounted the role of religion. Nevertheless, an increasing number of studies have begun to include religion as a factor of interest. However, many of these studies use religious identity, religiosity, and religiousness interchangeably or solely focus on religious identity and solely religious participation as separate constructs.

Of these types of research studies, researchers have examined the various factors that affect the strength of one's religious identity over time. Factors that have been found to affect levels of religious identity include gender, ethnicity, and generational status.

'Identity' is one of the most used terms in the social sciences and has different senses in different research paradigms. In addition to psychological studies, sociologists and anthropologists also apply the term 'religious identity' and examine its related processes in given social contexts. For example, one important study conducted in the United States after the events of September 11, 2001, explored the meaning-making among American Muslims and how changes in identity ascription (what people think about another group of people) affected how Muslims sought to represent themselves. Other studies have applied concepts appropriated from race and gender identity theory such as disidentification which undermines essentialist accounts of religious identity – that an individual has a 'fixed' religious identity, independent of pre-existing systems of representation and individuals' positioning within them.

Individuals who share the same religious identity are called coreligionists.

== History ==
During the early 1900s in the field of psychology, research on the topic of religion was considered important and ubiquitous. For example, researchers like G. Stanley Hall and William James conducted studies on such topics as religious conversion. In contrast, the public perspective on religion began to shift two decades later. Instead of religion being seen as an integral part of an individual's life and development and thus a necessary topic to research, scientists and scholars alike viewed religion as a hindrance to the progression of science and as a topic no longer applicable to the current times.

Contrary to social scientists' prediction of the general decline of religion over time and increase of secularization leading to a complete abandonment of religious studies, religion did not diminish and was instead acknowledged by researchers as a topic worthwhile to research. Scientists and scholars, like British sociologist John Thompson, realized that despite the neglect of religion in studies, the presence and impact of religion on individuals' lives were undeniable and did not disappear with time. Hence, a body of research on religion began to take root. Particularly, a handful of researchers were interested in examining religious identity during adolescence.

== Factors that affect religious identity ==
Given that religious traditions can be intricately interlaced with various aspects of culture, the religious identity literature has consistently yielded ethnic, gender, and generational differences.

=== Ethnic differences ===
According to Social Identity Theory, when individuals of ethnic minority backgrounds feel as if their identity is threatened, they may emphasize their other social identities as a means to maintain a positive self-concept. This idea is supported by the various studies that have shown higher levels of religious identity among ethnic minorities, particularly those from Latino and African American backgrounds, compared to European Americans.

=== Gender differences ===
Gender may also impact one's religious identity. Generally, females are more likely than males to attend religious services and express that religion is an important aspect of their lives. Studies have captured this gender difference through observations of females reporting greater religious attitudes. This was also shown in a four-year longitudinal study on religious involvement for adolescents living in rural settings. Females tended to be more involved in church-related activities than males and were more likely to view themselves as religious individuals.

=== Immigrant generational differences ===
There are three categories of generational status: First, Second, and Third. An individual who is considered to be first generation is one who was born outside of the country and immigrated. Second generation refers to an individual who was born in the country but whose parent(s) were foreign-born and immigrated. Lastly, third generation refers to an individual and the individual's parents were born in the country.

First and second generation individuals may tend to have particularly higher religious identity levels in comparison to third generation immigrants. In efforts to adjust to the stressful changes associated with the immigration process, finding a community of emotional, social, and financial support, an environment typically provided by a place of worship, may be highly sought after by immigrants. Studies have indeed revealed that adolescents from immigrant families (both first and second generation immigrants) reported higher levels of religious identity compared to adolescents whose parents are not immigrants (third generation).

=== Institutional factors ===
Studies suggest that institutional factors impact on religious identity. For example in a study of Christians, Jews and Muslims in English secondary schools adolescents reported negative representations of their religious traditions in the curriculum and common stereotypes held by their peers. These negative ascriptions were perceived by participants to influence their strategies of representing themselves, including hiding their religious affiliations or attempting to pre-empt criticism or bullying by representing the traditions they identified with in an apologetic conciliatory manner.

=== Religion's status ===
Research shows that events that undermine the status of a religion decrease religious identification. For example, abuse scandals in the Catholic church have been shown to reduce Catholic identification. This reduction in religious identification was strongest among individuals who identify as Black, are from low-income families, and whose parents have lower levels of education.

== Religious identity trajectories ==
By and large, numerous studies have observed ethnic, gender, and generational differences in religious identity. However, there have not been as many longitudinal studies on the influence of ethnicity, gender, and generational status on individuals' development of religious identity over time. Nevertheless, of the handful of such studies, researchers have focused mainly on adolescence and started to branch out to emerging adulthood.

=== Adolescence ===
Researchers have been particularly interested in studying identity during adolescence because it is a developmental period crucial to identity development. During this period, adolescents have opportunities to explore their ethnic, cultural, and religious traditions. However, the freedom and flexibility of their exploration is typically within the constraints of their parents or caregiver.

It was believed that religious identity and participation would both follow the same trajectory and decrease across time; hence, the studies that examined religiousness, which combines the two constructs. Although religious affiliation, identity, and participation are closely related, longitudinal research on adolescents suggests that these constructs have different trajectories from one another. For example, researchers have found that religious affiliation and identity for adolescents remained fairly stable across the high school years, which contradicts the expected change in religious affiliation from affiliated to unaffiliated and decrease in religious identity.

However, the stability of adolescent religious identity parallels that of other social identities such as ethnic identity. Researchers have reasoned that due to adolescents' relatively stable social environment, there is not a strong need to further explore and renegotiate their religious identity. Moreover, religious identity is mainly driven by parents during adolescence. Given that adolescents tend to still live with their parents during high school, there may not be a need to engage in deeper exploration of their religion, which may help explain the observed stable religious identity.

Whereas religious affiliation and identity remain stable, religious participation tends to decrease. Adolescents may exercise their increased autonomy and choose not to attend religious events. Particularly, adolescents may find other activities (e.g. studying, clubs, and sports) vying for their time and resources and choose to prioritize those activities over religious events. The significant decline in religious participation at the end of high school may be a precursor to further decline during emerging adulthood.

=== Emerging adulthood ===
Adolescence has been traditionally associated with a time of identity exploration. However, that exploration process is not complete by the end of adolescence. Rather, emerging adulthood, the years between late teens and late twenties, extends the identity formation process from adolescence.

This transitional period is marked by constant changes in romantic love, work, and worldviews and is generally a time of "semiautonomy." With this increased sense of autonomy, emerging adults may choose to further exert their independence by moving away from home and/or by attending college. Through whichever ways that emerging adults choose to exercise their autonomy, they are likely to find themselves in new, diverse environments teeming with a spectrum of vast worldviews.

Despite the necessity for studies on religious identity, there has been limited work on the role of religion in identity formation in emerging adults. Compared to the research in adolescence, there is much less work on the development of religious identity and religious participation across the emerging adulthood years. The combination of immense and frequent changes, increased autonomy, and diverse environments during this period has major ramifications for the development of emerging adults' religious affiliation, religious identity, and religious participation. In the period of emerging adulthood individuals gain a more complex understanding of religious ideas which can lead to periods of questioning, doubt, and conversion. These periods of change in emerging adulthood can lead to longer-term religious ideologies

Religion was believed to have little impact on emerging adults' identity, particularly for those who attend college However, recent research suggests otherwise. According to a study, while 14 percent of college students reported a decrease in religious beliefs throughout college, 48 percent reported stable religious beliefs, and 38 percent reported an increase.

Moreover, another study found that contrary to the expectations of decreased religious identity and religious participation during emerging adulthood, religious identity did not decrease, but religious participation did decline as predicted. Researchers explained that emerging adults are more likely to decrease their involvement in religious activities than they are to completely disaffiliate from their religion or express less importance of religion in their lives.

Additionally, in a study that examined the ways in which religion influenced emerging adults, researchers found that emerging adults' standards of adulthood were dependent upon the religious affiliation of the institution they attended. For example, compared to emerging adults who attended Catholic or public universities, emerging adults who attended Mormon universities rated interdependence, norm compliance, biological transitions, and family capacities as extremely important criteria for adulthood.

In summary, although not all studies on this topic are in agreement, religious identity generally tends to remain stable during emerging adulthood whereas religious participation decreases over time.

== See also ==
- Group cohesiveness, the strength of bonds linking members of a social group to one another and to the group as a whole
- Ethnic religion
- Koinonia, group cohesiveness among Christians
- Religion and geography
