= Role model =

Person who models a social role for others

A role model is a person whose behaviour, example, or success serves as a model to be emulated by others, especially by younger people. The term role model is credited to sociologist Robert K. Merton, who hypothesized that individuals compare themselves with reference groups of people who occupy the social role to which the individual aspires, an example of which is the way young fans may idolize and imitate professional athletes or entertainment artists.

In the second half of the twentieth century, U.S. advocates for workplace equity popularized the term and concept of role models as part of a larger social capital lexicon—which also includes terms such as glass ceiling, networking, mentoring, and gatekeeper—serving to identify and address the problems barring non-dominant groups from professional success. Mainstream business literature subsequently adopted the terms and concepts, promoting them as pathways to success for all career climbers. In 1970 these terms were not in the general American vocabulary; by the mid-1990s they had become part of everyday speech. Although the term role model has been criticized more recently as "outdated", the term and its associated responsibility remains prominent in the public consciousness as a commonly used phrase, and a "powerful presence" in the entertainment industry and media.

Role models can also be national. for example, Chilean politicians and intellectuals had France as the prime role model during much of the 19th century until they shifted to Germany in the last decades of the century. In short, a role model is a person looked to by others as an example to be imitated.

== Effect on career opportunity and choice ==
According to historian Pamela Laird, a person's chosen role models may have a considerable impact on his or her career opportunities and choices. The suitability of a role model depends, in part, on the admirer's perceived commonality with the model, who should provide an image of an ambitious yet realistic goal. For example, Laird suggests that, Benjamin Franklin served as the role model for countless nineteenth-century white businessmen, including notables such as Thomas Mellon, B.F. Goodrich, and Frederick Weyerhäuser. Laird suggests that the lack of commonalities between potential role models and would-be admirers helped perpetuate barriers to American minorities and women as they tried to advance in a business world dominated by white men, thus spurring late twentieth-century efforts to develop suitable role models for these groups.

Parent role models also significantly influence a person's "education and training aspirations, task self-efficacy, and expectancy for an entrepreneurial career".

== Celebrity role models ==
The ever-widening reach of the media in popular culture has elevated certain celebrities to worldwide acclaim. This boom of media coverage and constant exposure to these individuals resulted in a change of mindset toward celebrities in both adults and youth alike. According to a survey of teachers in the United Kingdom conducted in 2008 by the Association of Teachers and Lecturers, young people most frequently chose sports stars as role models, followed by pop stars. Many, however, simply aspired to be "famous for being famous", believing that fame and fortune could be easily accessed through reality television.

== Community role models ==
According to Rita Pierson, teachers, because of the large amount of time spent with children, have such a huge impact on children that they're being advised to be likeable in order to build strong emotional relationships with children.

== Athlete role models ==
There is significant discussion as to whether athletes should be considered role models. Some athletes have been asked to behave as if they were role models for their local communities, and some such as Hank Greenberg have deliberately tried to set a good example but generally regarding athletes as role models has been criticised due to their appointment often being based solely on sporting ability rather than any morality – it has been suggested that the discipline and control shown continuously by sportspeople on the field leads to a belief from viewers that these same qualities are continuously shown off the field. These and other factors such as the elements of competition, excitement and success are what make people want to emulate them. Charles Barkley has stated that he believes athletes are not the figures that children should be emulating and that it is the parent's responsibility to be role models, that the role is deliberately applied by the media out of jealousy in order to make life more difficult for sportspeople, and that it sets up the sportspeople as an unattainable target for most.

== Importance for children ==
Role models are visible in the process of child and personal development, through shaping a person's morals, aspirations, and even confidence level. Role models can have either a positive or negative influence on children, depending on what they are promoting. However, many studies have shown that positive relationships with a role model is associated with higher levels of certain traits, such as "elevated self-esteem, performance in school, and resilience". Role models, similar to mentors, have also proven to reduce risky behavior in adolescents.

Certain behaviors practiced by role models in an adolescent's life, can usually be seen replicated by that adolescent—due to the higher standard that the child holds their role model(s) to. One of the most commonly cited role models by children are their family members - because of the positive attributes that they are constantly exposed to.

Without these types of figures, to rely on through observational learning, during child development can result in ill decision-making skills, or even a lacking sense of self later down the road.

== Impact on young girls ==
Role models play an impactful role in shaping the aspirations, self-perceptions, and attitudes of girls, particularly when they intend to challenge traditional gender norms. Positive role models, especially women in male-dominated fields, such as STEM, can inspire the younger generation of women to expand their understandings of what is possible for them to achieve. According to a study conducted by Laurie T. O'Brien, middle school girls who interacted with competent and enthusiastic female scientists reported a greater sense of belonging in STEM fields.

Large field experiments have produced a nuanced picture. Brief classroom visits by female economists at a US university increased women's likelihood of majoring in economics, and visits by female scientists to French high schools raised girls' enrolment in selective STEM programs. However, a trial with nearly 30,000 Ecuadorian high-school students found that exposure to video interviews with role models from two career paths - STEM and entrepreneurship - reduced STEM enrolment for both boys and girls. The result suggests the contrast between career paths shapes students' choices.

Role Models play a part into younger children with their aspirations of a career choice. The Harvard Kennedy School conducted research on how the influence of role models for students interested in STEM, to which students agreed that their choice of who their role model reflected back with how they correlate and identify with their pick. The importance is underscored within the assumption that exposing children to gender counter-stereotypical role models can challenge their gendered aspirations.

In media, the portrayal of strong, independent female characters such as Disney Princesses, also influences girls' actions and perceptions of gender roles. Cartoons like Elsa and Mulan challenge traditional depictions of femininity by instead focusing on themes like bravery and independence as opposed to the typical portrayal of the beautiful, love interest princess. These portrayals encourage girls to embrace diverse qualities and pursue their personal ambitions, thereby fostering a sense of empowerment and resilience.

It is also important to note the influence of Disney Princesses within the younger generation of girls. Mulan is an example as she struggles with her identity, and in the song "Reflection", she questions societal exceptions that were placed upon her. In the movie, she wipes off her makeup and transforms from a potential bride into a warrior. Mulan disobeys the stereotypical role assigned to her as a woman and continues with her journey by empowering the message that it's okay to not conform into these social norms through encouraging individuals to embrace their true identities.

Within the 1950 version of Cinderella, there is discussion about the challenge of gender stereotypes. Cinderella shows a gentle side through the treatment she gets from her step-mother and step-sisters. Throughout her story she is treated like a housewife even if she doesn't agree with how she has to live. However, on the deeper level when it comes to appearance body dysmorphia comes into play. Towards the end of the movie, when her Prince Charming goes around the whole kingdom with her lost slipper trying to find his true love. Within recent perspectives as of 2021, children may be negatively affected by watching these older Disney movies, believing that being a princess is having to fit the weight criteria or that their personal family will be as perfect as they are within the movie(s).

However the impact of role models is nuanced. While short term exposure to non-traditional female role models can help reduce gender stereotypes in certain situations, it does not always translate to sustained changes in behavior or career aspirations. Studies like one done by Frontiers in Psychology show that lasting influence requires ongoing engagement and support, such as mentorship programs.

On the other hand, of things, researchers observed same-sex role models in the same job field foster gender-congruent aspirations and behavior. This learning process leads children to adopt gender-stereotypical knowledge which later on influences their aspirations to align with traditional gender roles (e.g., women aspiring to take care of individuals, men being represented into typical leadership positions). The research also found that children who are exposed to gender-incongruent roles such as male kindergarten teachers, or female scientists then this can challenger traditional gender norms. Individuals who are defy to gender stereotypes reduce the impact of gender stereotyping within children, in the end leads to stereotypical aspirations and behaviors.

== See also ==
- Virtue ethics
- Celebrity
- Identification (psychology)
- Model
- Role engulfment
