= Social defeat =

Loss in a confrontation between animals, including humans

In biology and behavioural psychology, social defeat refers to the physiological and behavioral effects on the losing party in a confrontation among animals of the same species, or in any kind of hostile dispute among humans. Social defeat can potentially greatly affect an individual's control over resources, access to mates, and social position, and the term is used in both dyadic (one-on-one) and group-individual contexts.

== Background ==
Research on social stress has accumulated a useful body of knowledge, providing perspective on the effects of detrimental social and environmental interaction on the brain. Research and experimentation suffer from many methodological difficulties: usually a lack of ecological validity (similarity with natural conditions and stressors) or are not amenable to scientific investigation (difficult to test and verify).

Social psychology approaches to human aggression have developed a multitude of perspectives based on observations of human phenomena such as bullying, mobbing, physical and verbal abuse, and relational aggression. Despite the richness of theories developed, the body of knowledge generated has not satisfied scientific requirements of testability and verifiability.

Animal studies of within-species aggression developed in two main branches. One approach is based on laboratory experiments in controlled conditions, which allows the measurement of behavioral, endocrine and neurological variables, but requires the application of unnatural stressors (such as foot-shocks and restraint stress) in unnatural conditions (laboratory cages rarely approximate native habitats), which potentially limits the applicability of results to natural conditions. Another is based on observations of animals in naturalistic settings, which avoids artificial environments and unnatural stresses, but usually does not allow the measurement of physiological effects or the manipulation of relevant variables.

In real life situations, animals (including humans) have to cope with stresses generated during their interactions with other members of their own species, especially due to recurrent struggles over the control of limited resources, mates and social positions.

Social defeat is a source of chronic stress in animals and humans, capable of causing significant changes in behaviour, brain functioning, physiology, neurotransmitter and hormone levels, and health.

== History ==
The social defeat approach originated from animal experiments, using the "resident-intruder" paradigm, in which an animal was placed in the cage of another animal or group of animals of the same species, in a manner that allowed a non-lethal conflict. It has been documented to produce anxiety-like and depressive-like behavioral declines in susceptible mice.

If animals are allowed to fight on a single occasion only, it is usually regarded as a model of acute stress; if they are allowed to fight on several occasions, on different days, consecutive or not, it is regarded as a model of chronic stress. After the defeat or in the interval between fights, the subordinate animal may also be exposed to threats from the dominant one, by having to stay in a cage or compartment beside or nearby the dominant, exposed to its visual or olfactory cues.

Later, the social defeat approach was also applied to observations of intra-species aggression in the wild, which suggested that the hypotheses generated in artificial laboratory settings can also be applied in observed in natural settings.

== In humans ==
It has been proposed that animal models of social conflict may be useful for studying a number of mental disorders, including major depression, generalized anxiety disorder, post-traumatic stress disorder, drug abuse, aggressive psychopathologies, eating disorders and schizophrenia.

The social defeat model has been extended to include observations of human aggression, bullying, relational aggression, chronic subordination and humiliation. The social defeat model attempts to extend animal studies to include human behaviour as well, in contrast to the study of aggression in social psychology, in which comparisons are drawn exclusively from experiments involving humans.

Bullying has interesting parallels with animal models of social defeat, the bully being equivalent to the dominant animal and the victim the subordinate one. Similarly at stake are possession of and access to resources, social position in the group through in-group prestige, and the potential consequential lack of access to mates, including for socio-sexual behaviors like copulation. Human victims typically experience symptoms like low self-esteem (due to low regard by the group), feelings of depression (due to unworthiness of efforts), social withdrawal (reduced investments in the social environment), anxiety (due to a threatening environment), and they can also be shown to experience a plethora of physiological effects such as increased corticosterone levels, and a shift towards sympathetic balance in the autonomic nervous system.

Research about human aggression, usually conducted by psychologists or social psychologists, resembles to a great extent the research about social defeat and animal aggression, usually conducted by biologists or physiological psychologists. The different disciplines use different terminologies for similar concepts however, which hinders communication between the two bodies of knowledge.

Similarly, research on depression has employed similar constructs, such as learned helplessness, although that theory is focused on the perceived inability to escape any sort of negative stimuli rather than on social factors.

== Behavioral and physiological effects ==
Social defeat is a very potent stressor and can lead to a variety of behavioral effects, like social withdrawal (reduced interactions with conspecifics), lethargy (reduced locomotor activity), reduced exploratory behavior (of both open field and novel objects), anhedonia (reduced reward-related behaviors), decreased socio-sexual behaviors (including decreased attempts to mate and copulate after defeat), various motivational deficits, decreased levels of testosterone in males (due to a decline in the functionality of the Leydig cells of the testes), increased tendencies to stereotyped behaviours and self-administration of drugs and alcohol.

Research also implicates that the referred behavioral effects are moderated by neuroendocrine phenomena involving serotonin, dopamine, epinephrine, norepinephrine, and in the hypothalamic-pituitary-adrenal axis, locus ceruleus and limbic systems. In separate studies, defeat behaviors can be modulated by acetylcholine.

A useful concept in understanding the causal relationship between these behavioral and neuroendocrine effects is that of the 'causal chain', in which recurrent evolutionary events, in this case intra-specific competition, generate selective pressures that influence a whole species. Physiological phenomena may therefore evolve to facilitate adaptive patterns of action by individuals. According to this framework, selective pressures generated by intra-specific competition can be considered as the ultimate cause, the neuroendocrine phenomena can be considered to be the proximate causes (sometimes also called mechanisms or moderators) and the observed behavioral alterations are considered the effects (the end events in the causal chain).

Both animal and human studies suggest that the social environment has a strong influence on the consequences of stresses. This finding seems to be especially true in the case of social stresses, like social defeat. In animal studies, animals housed collectively showed reduced symptoms after defeat, in comparison with those housed alone; and animals that live in more stable groups (with stable hierarchies, less intra-group aggression) exhibit reduced effects after a defeat, in comparison with those housed in a more unstable group. Similarly, in human studies individuals with greater support seem to be protected against excessive neuroendocrine activation, thereby reducing the adverse effects of stresses in general, and especially stresses of social origin.

== Potential evolutionary causes ==
Some authors, for example Randolph Nesse, warn that patterns of behavior commonly considered inappropriate or even pathological may well have adaptive value. Evolutionary psychology provides several possible explanations for why humans typically respond to social dynamics in the way that they do, including possible functions of self-esteem in relation to dominance hierarchies. Various behaviors related to intra-species competition or predator-prey relationships seen in a number of different animal species may have played a role in the evolution of human abilities. For example defensive immobilization is hypothesized to have played a role in the evolution of both human parent-child attachment and the development of theory of mind. Human behaviors considered abnormal may in fact be part of an adaptive response to stressors that evolved in early humans, for example social stressors from chronic subordination or interpersonal conflicts.

== See also ==
- Bullying
- Social determinants of health
- Social determinants of mental health
- Social exclusion
- Social rejection
- Social stigma

== General references ==
- Bartolomucci, A; Palanza,P.; Sacerdote,P.; Panerai,A.E.; Sgoifo,A.; Dantzer,R.; Parmigiani, S (2005). "Social factors and individual vulnerability to chronic stress exposure". Neuroscience and Biobehavioral Reviews. 29 (1): 67–81. doi:10.1016/j.neubiorev.2004.06.009. PMID 15652256. S2CID 38146908.
- Buwaldaa, B; Kole, M.; Veenema, A.H.; Huininga, M.; Boer, S.F. de; Korte, S.M.; Koolhaas, J.M. (2005). "Long-term effects of social stress on brain and behavior: a focus on hippocampal functioning". Neuroscience and Biobehavioral Reviews. 29 (1): 83–97. doi:10.1016/j.neubiorev.2004.05.005. hdl:11370/ebd1337d-2e99-42f1-974e-76207cb46420. PMID 15652257. S2CID 20476506.
- Laviola, G.; Adriani, W.; Rea, M.; Aloe, L.; Alleva, E. (2004). "Social withdrawal, neophobia, and stereotyped behavior in developing rats exposed to neonatal asphyxia". Psychopharmacology. 175 (2): 196–205. doi:10.1007/s00213-004-1800-3. PMID 14985924. S2CID 24682349.
- Sgoifo, A.; Costolia, T.; Meerlob, P.; Buwalda, B.; Pico'-Alfonsoa, M.A.; De Boerc, S.; Mussoa, E.; Koolhaas, J. (2005). "Individual differences in cardiovascular response to social challenge". Neuroscience and Biobehavioral Reviews. 29 (1): 59–66. doi:10.1016/j.neubiorev.2004.07.001. hdl:11381/1445989. PMID 15652255. S2CID 42806161.
- Sloman, L.; Farvolden, P.; Gilbert, P.; Price, J. (2006). "The interactive functioning of anxiety and depression in agonistic encounters and reconciliation". Journal of Affective Disorders. 90 (2–3): 93–99. doi:10.1016/j.jad.2005.12.001. PMID 16442166.
- T. Steckler; N. H. Kalin; J. M. H. M. Reul (2005). Handbook of Stress and the Brain (part 2). Elsevier. pp. 113+. ISBN 978-0-444-51823-1.
- Van Reeth, O; Weibel, L.; Spiegel, K.; Leproult, R.; Dugovic, C.; Maccari, S. (2000). "Physiology of sleep (review) - Interactions between stress and sleep; from basic research to clinical situations". Sleep Medicine Reviews. 4 (2): 201–219. doi:10.1053/smrv.1999.0097.
