= Rema Lapouse Award =

Rema Lapouse Award is granted to an outstanding scientist in the area of psychiatric epidemiology in recognition of "significant contributions to the scientific understanding of the epidemiology and control of mental disorders. It is sponsored by the Mental Health, Epidemiology, and Applied Public Health Statistics Sections of the American Public Health Association. It was established in 1972 by the American physician Milton Terris in honor of his wife, Dr. Rema Lapouse, who was a founding member of the Mental Health Section.

== Recipients ==
- 1972 – H. Warren Dunham
- 1973 – Morton Kramer
- 1974 – Paul V. Lemkau
- 1975 – Alexander H. Leighton
- 1976 – Ernest M. Gruenberg
- 1977 – Benjamin Pasamanick
- 1978 – Olle Hagnell
- 1979 – Lee Robins
- 1980 – Norman Sartorius
- 1981 – Bruce Dohrenwend and Barbara Snell Dohrenwend
- 1982 – Jerome K. Myers
- 1983 – Michael Shepherd
- 1984 – Ming Tso Tsuang
- 1985 – Myrna Weissman
- 1986 – Michael Rutter
- 1987 – Darrel Regier, M.D., M.P.H
- 1988 – Janice Egeland
- 1989 – Evelyn J. Bromet
- 1990 – Ben Locke, M.S.
- 1991 – John Wing
- 1992 – R. Jay Turner
- 1993 – Jane Murphy Leighton
- 1994 – George Brown
- 1995 – Dan Offord
- 1996 – Sheppard Kellam
- 1997 – Ronald C. Kessler
- 1998 – Spero M. Manson
- 1999 – Elizabeth Jane Costello
- 2000 – William W. Eaton
- 2001 – Dan German Blazer
- 2002 – Kenneth S. Kendler
- 2003 – David Mechanic
- 2004 – C. Hendricks Brown
- 2005 – Mervyn Susser
- 2006 – Felton James Earls
- 2007 – Bruce G. Link
- 2008 – Terrie Moffitt and Avshalom Caspi
- 2009 – Glorisa Canino
- 2010 – Kung-Yee Liang
- 2011 – Ezra Susser
- 2012 – Robert D. Gibbons
- 2013 – William A. Vega
- 2014 – Patrick E. Shrout
- 2015 – Sandro Galea
- 2016 - James C. (Jim) Anthony
- 2017 – Kathleen Merikangas
- 2018 – James S. Jackson
- 2019 – Denise Bystryn Kandel
- 2020 – Margarita Alegria
- 2021 – Linda B. Cottler
- 2022 - Graham Thornicroft
- 2023 - Preben Bo Mortensen
- 2024 - Wilson M. Compton
- 2025 - Deborah Hasin

=== Other recipients ===
- No other known recipients.

== See also ==
- List of medicine awards
