= Dohrenwend =

Dohrenwend is a surname. Notable people with this surname include:

- Barbara Snell Dohrenwend (1927–1982), American epidemiologist and social psychologist
- Bruce Dohrenwend (born 1927), American psychiatric epidemiologist, widower of Barbara
- Otto Dohrenwend (1899–1989), American investment banker
