= Hignell =

Hignell is a surname. Notable people with the surname include:

- Alastair Hignell (born 1955), English rugby union player, cricketer, and commentator
- Andrew Hignell (born 1959), English cricket writer
- Antony Hignell (1928–2015), English cricketer and javelin thrower

== See also ==
- Hagnell
