= Adult =

Fully grown animal

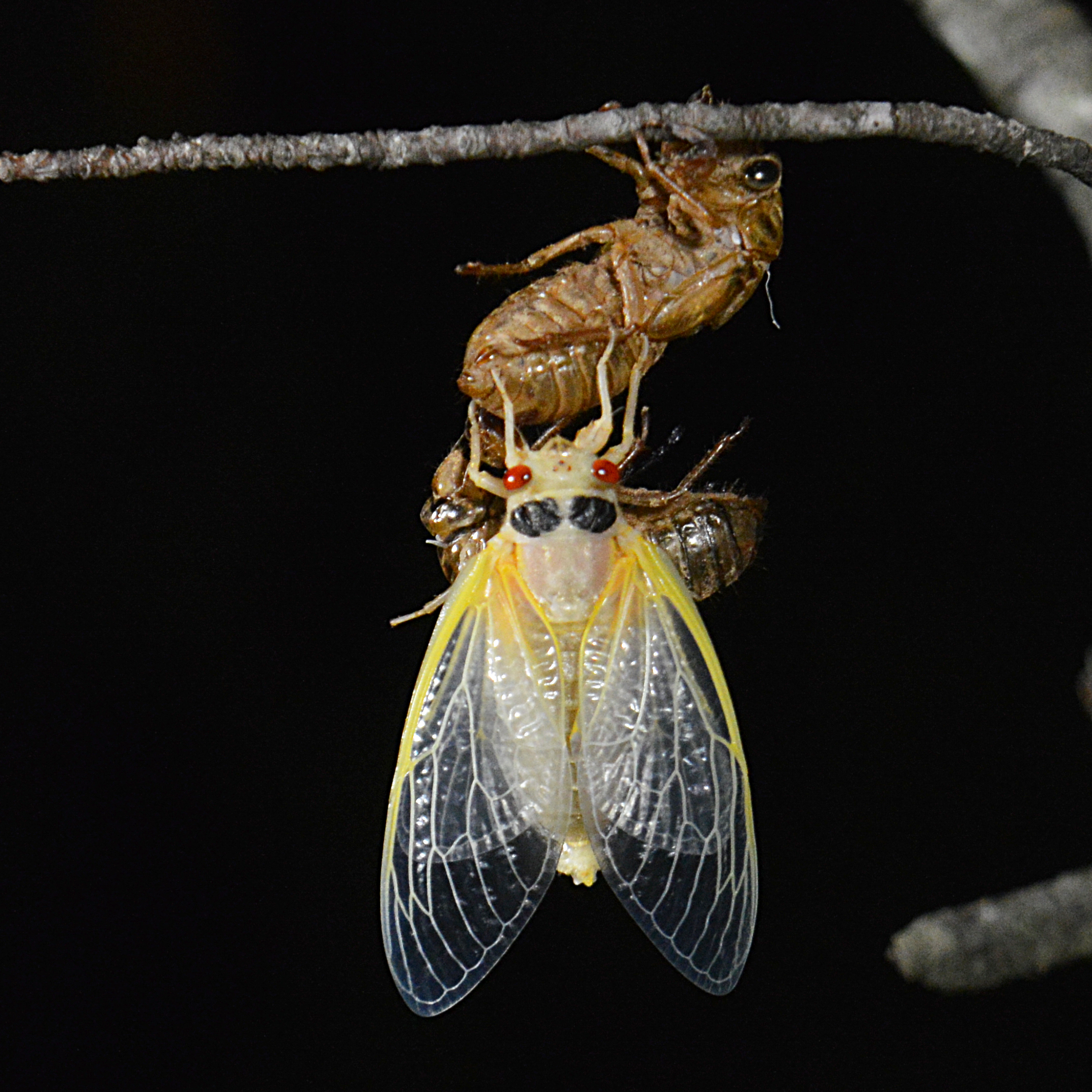
A newly molted adult periodical cicada clinging to the empty nymphal exoskeletons (exuviae), marking the end of its physical growth.

An adult is an animal that has reached full growth. The biological definition of adult is an organism that has reached sexual maturity and is thus capable of reproduction.

In the human context, the term adult has meanings associated with legal and social concepts. In contrast to a non-adult or "minor", a legal adult is a person who has attained the age of majority and is therefore regarded as independent, self-sufficient, and responsible. They may also be regarded as "majors". The typical age of attaining adulthood for humans is 18 years, although definition may vary by country. A person may be physically mature and a biological adult by approximately age 15 or 16, but not defined as an adult by law until older ages, mostly commonly 18, 20 or 21. For example, in the US, one cannot join the armed forces or vote until age 18, and one cannot take on many legal and financial responsibilities until age 21.

Human adulthood encompasses psychological adult development. Definitions of adulthood are often inconsistent and contradictory; a person may be biologically an adult, and have adult behavior, but still be treated as a child if they are under the legal age of majority. Conversely, one may legally be an adult but possess none of the maturity and responsibility that may define an adult character.

In different cultures, there are events that relate passing from being a child to becoming an adult or coming of age. This often encompasses passing a series of tests to demonstrate that a person is prepared for adulthood, or reaching a specified age, sometimes in conjunction with demonstrating preparation. Most modern societies determine legal adulthood based on reaching a legally specified age without requiring a demonstration of physical maturity or preparation for adulthood.

== Biological adulthood ==
Historically and cross-culturally, adulthood has been determined primarily by the start of puberty (the appearance of secondary sex characteristics such as menstruation and the development of breasts in women, ejaculation, the development of facial hair, and a deeper voice in men, and pubic hair in both sexes). In the past, a person usually moved from the status of child directly to the status of adult, often with this shift being marked by some type of coming-of-age test or ceremony.

During the Industrial Revolution, children went to work as soon as they could in order to help provide for their family. There was not a huge emphasis on school or education in general. Many children could get a job and were not required to have experience as adults are nowadays. In recent years, studies of adulthood have identified characteristic traits that go far beyond mere physical maturity. These markers for a full, mentally developed, adult include traits of personal responsibilities in multiple aspects of life.

Although few or no established dictionaries provide a definition for the two-word term biological adult, the first definition of adult in multiple dictionaries includes "the stage of the life cycle of an animal after reproductive capacity has been attained". Thus, the base definition of the word adult is the period beginning at physical sexual maturity, which occurs sometime after the onset of puberty. Although this is the primary definition of the base word "adult", the term is also frequently used to refer to social adults. The two-word term biological adult stresses or clarifies that the original definition, based on physical maturity (i.e. having reached reproductive competency), is being used.

The time of puberty varies from child to child, but usually begins between 10 and 12 years old. Girls typically begin the process of puberty at age 10 or 11, and boys at age 11 or 12. Girls generally complete puberty by 15–17, and boys by age 16 or 17. Nutrition, genetics and environment also usually play a part in the onset of puberty. Girls will go through a growth spurt and gain weight in several areas of their body. Boys will go through similar spurts in growth, though it is usually not in a similar style or time frame. This is due to the natural processes of puberty, but genetics also plays a part in how much weight they gain or how much taller they get.

One recent area of debate within the science of brain development is the most likely chronological age for full mental maturity, or indeed, if such an age even exists. Common claims repeated in the media since 2005 (based upon interpretations of imaging data) have commonly suggested an "end-point" of age 25, referring to the prefrontal cortex as one area that is not yet fully mature at the age of 18. However, this is based on an interpretation of a brain imaging study by Jay Giedd, dating back to 2004 or 2005, where the only participants were aged up to 21 years, and Giedd assumed this maturing process would be done by the age of 25 years, whereas more recent studies show prefrontal cortex maturation continuing well past the age of 30 years, marking this interpretation as incorrect and outdated.

== Legal adulthood ==
Legally, adulthood typically means that one has reached the age of majority – when parents lose parental rights and responsibilities regarding the person concerned. Depending on one's jurisdiction, the age of majority may or may not be set independently of and should not be confused with the minimum ages applicable to other activities, such as engaging in a contract, marriage, voting, having a job, serving in the military, buying/possessing firearms, driving, traveling abroad, involvement with alcoholic beverages, smoking, sexual activity, gambling, being a model or actor in pornography, running for president, etc. Admission of a young person to a place may be restricted because of danger for that person, concern that the place may lead the person to immoral behavior, or because of the risk that the young person causes damage (for example, at an exhibition of fragile items).

One can distinguish the legality of acts of a young person, or of enabling a young person to carry out that act, by selling, renting out, showing, permitting entrance, allowing participation, etc. There may be distinction between commercially and socially enabling. Sometimes there is the requirement of supervision by a legal guardian, or just by an adult. Sometimes there is no requirement, but rather a recommendation.

Using the example of pornography, one can distinguish between:

- being allowed inside an adult establishment
- being allowed to purchase pornography
- being allowed to possess pornography
- another person being allowed to sell, rent out, or show the young person pornography, see disseminating pornography to a minor
- being a pornographic actor: rules for the young person, and for other people, regarding production, possession, etc. (see child pornography)

With regard to films with violence, etc.:

- another person being allowed to sell, rent out, or show the young person a film; a cinema being allowed to let a young person enter

The age of majority ranges internationally from ages 15 to 21, with 18 being the most common age. Nigeria, Mali, Democratic Republic of Congo and Cameroon define adulthood at age 15, but marriage of girls at an earlier age is common.

In most of the world, the legal adult age is 18 for most purposes, with some notable exceptions:

1. The legal age of adulthood in British Columbia, New Brunswick, Newfoundland and Labrador, Northwest Territories, Nova Scotia, Nunavut, and Yukon in Canada is 19 (though there are some exceptions in which Canadians may be considered legal adults in certain situations like sexual consent, which is age 16, and criminal law, federal elections and the military, which is at 18);
2. The legal age of adulthood in Nebraska and Alabama in the United States is 19.
3. The legal age of adulthood in South Korea is 19.
4. The legal age of adulthood in Mississippi and Puerto Rico in the U.S. and Bahrain is 21.

Prior to the 1970s, young people were not classed as adults until 21 in most western nations. For example, in the United States, young citizens could not vote in many elections until 21 until July 1971 when the 26th Amendment passed mandating that the right to vote cannot be abridged for anyone 18 or older. The voting age was lowered in response to the fact that young men between the ages of 18 and 21 were drafted into the army to fight in the Vietnam War, hence the popular slogan "old enough to fight, old enough to vote".

Young people under 21 in the US could also not purchase alcohol, purchase handguns, sign a binding contract, or marry without permission from parents. After the voting age was lowered, many states also moved to lower the drinking age (with most states having a minimum age of 18 or 19) and also to lower the age of legal majority (adulthood) to 18. However, there are legal activities where 18 is not the default age of adulthood. There are still some exceptions where 21 (or even higher) is still the benchmark for certain rights or responsibilities. For example, in the US the Gun Control Act of 1968 prohibits those under 21 from purchasing a handgun from a federally licensed dealer (although federal law makes an exception for individuals between the ages of 18 and 20 to obtain one from a private dealer if state law permits.)

As of July 1984, the National Minimum Drinking Age Act mandated that all states raise their respective drinking ages to 21 to create a uniform standard for legally purchasing, drinking, or publicly possessing alcohol with exceptions made for consumption only in private residences under parental supervision and permission. This was done in response to reducing the number of drunk driving fatalities prevalent among young drivers. States that choose not to comply can lose up to 10% of highway funding.

The Credit Card Act of 2009 imposed tougher safeguards for young adults between the ages of 18 and 20 obtaining a credit card. Young adults under the age of 21 must either have a co-signer 21 or older or show proof (usually a source of income) that they can repay their credit card balance. Unless that requirement is met, one must wait until 21 to be approved for a credit card on their own.

The Affordable Care Act of 2010 expands the age that young adults can remain on their parent's health insurance plan up to age 26.

As of December 2019, the federal government raised the legal age to purchase tobacco and vaping products from 18 to 21. In states where recreational marijuana is legalized, the default age is also 21, though those younger may be able to obtain medical marijuana prescriptions or cards upon seeing a physician.

Gambling also varies from 18 to 21 depending on the state and many rental car companies do not rent cars to those under 21 and have surcharges for drivers under 25 (although this is not codified, and is company policy).

In Quebec, Canada the Quebec legislature in 2020 raised the age one could purchase recreational marijuana from 18 to 21 stepping out of line with most of the country that set a minimum age of 19 (except Alberta, which is 18.) The Quebec government cited the risk that marijuana poses to the brain development of people under 21 as justification for the age raise.

In March 2021, the state of Washington in a 5–4 decision, justices in the Supreme Court of the State of Washington tossed the life without parole sentences of a 19-year-old and a 20-year-old convicted in separate cases of first-degree aggravated murder decades ago, saying, as with juveniles, the court must first consider the age of those under 21 before sentencing them to die behind bars. This comes at a time when there are ongoing debates about whether those between 18 and 20 should be exempted from the death penalty.

In Germany, courts largely sentence defendants under the age of 21 according to juvenile law in a bid to help them reintegrate into society and mete out punishments that fit the crime as well as the offender. In May 2021, the state of Texas raised the age that one can be an exotic dancer and work and patronize sexually oriented businesses from 18 to 21. In the UK, there have been many proposals to raise the age that one can buy tobacco from 18 to 21 in an attempt to curb teen and young adult use to get to a "smoke-free" UK by 2030. All of these laws made over the years reflect the growing awareness that young adults, while not children, are still in a transitional stage between adolescence and full adulthood and that there should be policy adjustments or restrictions where necessary, especially where it pertains to activities that carry certain degrees of risk or harm to themselves or others.

At the same time, however, even though the generally accepted age of majority is 18 in most nations, there are rights or privileges afforded to adolescents who have not yet reached legal adulthood. In the United States, youth are able to get a part-time job at 14 provided they have a work permit. At 16, one is able to obtain a driver's permit or license depending on state laws and is able to work most jobs (except ones requiring heavy machinery) and consent to sexual activity (depending on the state). At 17, one is able to enlist in the armed forces with parental consent although they cannot be deployed to be in combat roles until age 18.

The voting age for local elections in most American cities is 18. But in five localities nationwide — four of which are in Maryland — 16 and 17-year-olds are eligible to vote. The cities are Takoma Park, Riverdale, Greenbelt, and Hyattsville.

In 2020, students 16 or older in Oakland, California gained the right to vote in school board elections. There is a growing movement to lower the voting age in the US and many other countries from 18 to 16 in hopes of engaging the youth vote and encouraging greater electoral participation. Some countries already have a voting age of 16 which include Austria, Scotland, Argentina, Brazil, Wales, Cuba, and Ecuador.

In Germany, one can purchase beer and wine at the age of 16 although they cannot purchase spirits or hard liquor until 18. The age of consent in Germany is 14 if both partners are under 18. Sexual activity with a person under 18 is punishable if the adult is a person of authority over the minor in upbringing, education, care, or employment.

== Social construction of adulthood ==
In contrast to biological perspectives of aging and adulthood, social scientists conceptualize adulthood as socially constructed. While aging is an established biological process, the attainment of adulthood is social in its criteria. In contrast to other perspectives that conceptualize aging and the attainment of adulthood as a largely universal development, regardless of context, nation, generation, gender, race, or social class. Social scientists regard these aspects as paramount in cultural definitions of adulthood.

Further evidence of adulthood as a social construction is illustrated by the changing criteria of adulthood over time. Historically, adulthood in the U.S. has rested on completing one's education, moving away from the family of origin, and beginning one's career. Other key historical criteria include entering a marriage and becoming a parent. These criteria are social and subjective; they are organized by gender, race, ethnicity, and social class, among other key identity markers. As a result, particular populations feel adult earlier in the life course than do others.

Contemporary experiences of and research on young adults today substitute more seemingly subjective criteria for adulthood which resonate more soundly with young adults' experiences of aging. The criteria are marked by a growing "importance of individualistic criteria and the irrelevance of the demographic markers of normative conceptions of adulthood." In particular, younger cohorts' attainment of adulthood centers on three criteria: gaining a sense of responsibility, independent decision-making, and financial independence.

Jeffrey Arnett, a psychologist and professor at Clark University in Massachusetts, studied the development of adults and argues that there is a new and distinct period of development in between adolescence and adulthood. This stage, which he calls "emerging adulthood", occurs between the ages of 18 and 25. Arnett describes these individuals as able to take some responsibility for their lives, but still not completely feeling like an adult. Arnett articulates five distinct features that are unique to this period of development: identity exploration, feeling in between, instability, self-focus, and having possibilities. Arnett makes it clear that these 5 aspects of emerging adulthood are only relevant during the life stage of emerging adulthood.

The first feature, identity exploration, describes emerging adults making decisions for themselves about their career, education, and love life. This is a time of life when a young person has yet to finalize these decisions but are pondering them, making them feel somewhere in between adolescent and adult. This leads into a second feature of this phase of life—feeling in between. Emerging adults feel that they are taking on responsibilities but do not feel like a 'full' adult quite yet. Next, the instability feature notes that emerging adults often move around after their high school years whether that is to college, friends' houses, or living with a romantic partner, as well as moving back home with their parents/guardians for a time. This moving around often ends once the individual's family and career have been set. Tagging along with the instability feature is having self-focus. Emerging adults, being away from their parental and societal routines, are now able to do what they want when they want and where they want before they are put back into a routine when they start a marriage, family, and career. Arnett's last feature of emerging adulthood, an age of possibilities, characterizes this stage as one where "optimism reigns". These individuals believe they have a good chance of turning out better than their parents did.

== Religion ==
According to Jewish tradition, adulthood is reached at age 13 for Jewish boys and 12 for Jewish girls in accordance with the Bar or Bat Mitzvah; they are expected to demonstrate preparation for adulthood by learning the Torah and other Jewish practices. The Christian Bible and Jewish scripture contain no age requirement for adulthood or marrying, which includes engaging in sexual activity.

The 1983 Code of Canon Law states, "A man before he has completed his sixteenth year of age, and likewise a woman before she has completed her fourteenth year of age, cannot enter a valid marriage". According to The Disappearance of Childhood by Neil Postman, the Christian Church of the Middle Ages considered the age of accountability, when a person could be tried and even executed as an adult, to be age 7. While certain religions have their guidelines on what it means to be an adult, generally speaking, there are trends that occur regarding religiosity as individuals transition from adolescence to adulthood. The role of religion in one's life can impact development during adolescence.

The National Library of Medicine (NCBI) highlights some studies that show rates of religiosity declining as people move out of the house and live on their own. Oftentimes when people live on their own, they change their life goals and religion tends to be less important as they discover who they are. Other studies from the NCBI show that as adults get married and have children they settle down, and as they do, there tends to be an increase in religiosity. Everyone's level of religiosity builds at a different pace, meaning that religion relative to adult development varies across cultures and time.

== See also ==
- Adultism
- Overparenting
- Manhood
- Womanhood
