= Vulnerability =

Exposure to risk of harm

Vulnerability refers to "the quality or state of being exposed to the possibility of being attacked or harmed, either physically or emotionally." The understanding of social and environmental vulnerability, as a methodological approach, involves the analysis of the risks and assets of disadvantaged groups, such as the elderly. The approach of vulnerability in itself brings great expectations of social policy and gerontological planning. Types of vulnerability include social, cognitive, environmental, emotional or military.

In relation to hazards and disasters, vulnerability is a concept that links the relationship that people have with their environment to social forces and institutions and the cultural values that sustain and contest them. "The concept of vulnerability expresses the multi-dimensionality of disasters by focusing attention on the totality of relationships in a given social situation which constitute a condition that, in combination with environmental forces, produces a disaster". It is also the extent to which changes could harm a system, or to which the community can be affected by the impact of a hazard or exposed to the possibility of being attacked or harmed, either physically or emotionally.

Within the body of literature related to vulnerability, one major research stream includes the methodology behind said research, namely measuring and assessing indicators of vulnerability. These include external—sudden shocks and continued stresses—and internal indicators, such as defenselessness or inability to cope with incapacities. Vulnerability research covers a complex, multidisciplinary field including development and poverty studies, public health, climate studies, security studies, engineering, geography, political ecology, and disaster risk management (as well as risk management). This research is of importance and interest for organizations trying to reduce vulnerability – especially as related to poverty and other Millennium Development Goals. Many institutions are conducting interdisciplinary research on vulnerability. A forum that brings many of the current researchers on vulnerability together is the Expert Working Group on Measuring Vulnerability (EWG), convened by the United Nations University Institute for Environment and Human Security. Researchers are currently working to refine definitions of "vulnerability", measurement and assessment methods, and effective communication of research to decision makers.

== Types ==
=== Social ===
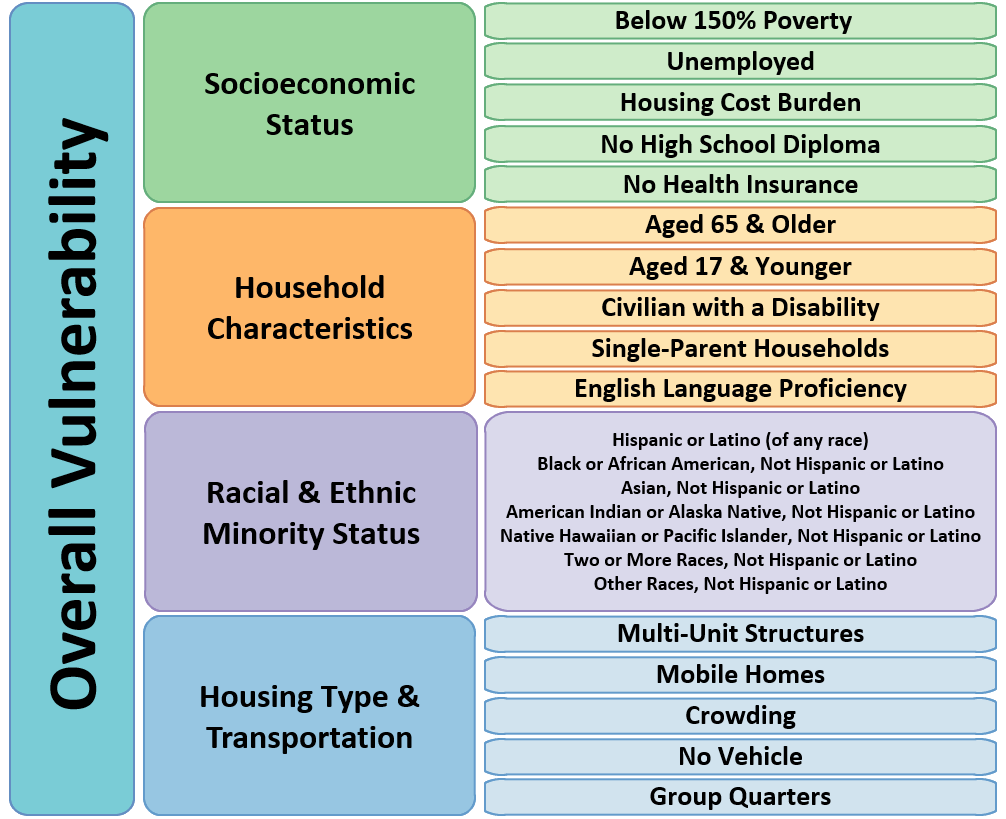
CDC/ATSDR Social Vulnerability Index variables grouped into four themes

Social vulnerability is one dimension of vulnerability that responds to multiple stressors (agent responsible for stress) and shocks, including abuse, social exclusion and natural hazards. Social vulnerability refers to the inability of people, organizations, and societies to withstand adverse impacts from multiple stressors to which they are exposed. These impacts are due in part to characteristics inherent in social interactions, institutions, and systems of cultural values. It was also found that marital status, employment, and income have an impact on the level of vulnerability presented in individuals. In this respect, there is a need to place an increased emphasis on assets and entitlements for understanding 'catastrophe' as opposed to solely the strength or severity of shocks. The capacity of individuals, communities and systems to survive, adapt, transform, and grow in the face of stress and shocks increase when conditions require it. Building resilience is about making people, communities, and systems better prepared to withstand catastrophic events—both natural and man-made—and able to bounce back more quickly and emerge stronger from these shocks and stresses.

A window of vulnerability (WOV) is a time frame within which defensive measures are diminished, compromised, or lacking. The phrase entered wide use in the late 1970s, when American defense planners argued that United States land-based missiles were becoming open to a Soviet first strike, a claim later judged to have been overstated.

=== Cognitive ===
A cognitive vulnerability, in cognitive psychology, is an erroneous belief, cognitive bias, or pattern of thought that is believed to predispose the individual to psychological problems. Cognitive vulnerability is in place before the symptoms of psychological disorders start to appear, such as high neuroticism. After the individual encounters a stressful experience, the cognitive vulnerability shapes a maladaptive response that may lead to a psychological disorder. In psychopathology, cognitive vulnerability is constructed from schema models, hopelessness models, and attachment theory. The attachment theory states that humans need to develop a close bond with at least one of their primary caregivers. When there is a disruption in the child-parent bonding relationship it may be associated with cognitive vulnerability and depression. Attentional bias is a form of cognitive bias that can lead to cognitive vulnerability. Allocating a danger level to a threat depends on the urgency or intensity of the threshold. Anxiety is not associated with selective orientation.

=== Environmental or climate change ===
Climate change vulnerability is a measure of how strongly people or ecosystems are likely to be affected by climate change. Its formal definition is the "propensity or predisposition to be adversely affected" by climate change. It can apply to humans and also to natural systems (or ecosystems). Issues around the capacity to cope and adapt are also part of this concept. Vulnerability is a component of climate risk. It differs within communities and also across societies, regions, and countries. It can increase or decrease over time. Vulnerability is generally a bigger problem for people in low-income countries than for those in high-income countries.

=== Emotional ===
In clinical psychology, emotional vulnerability refers to a temperament in which a person is unusually sensitive to emotional stimuli, reacts to them intensely, and takes a long time to return to baseline afterwards. The idea is central to Marsha Linehan's biosocial theory of borderline personality disorder, on which dialectical behavior therapy is built. In that theory, lasting problems with emotion regulation develop when a child born with this vulnerability grows up in an "invalidating environment" that dismisses, punishes, or reacts unpredictably to displays of private emotional experience. Researchers in personality psychology describe high neuroticism in similar terms, as a broad emotional vulnerability that raises the risk of later anxiety and mood disorders.

Research on close relationships treats the willingness to be emotionally vulnerable with another person as one of the main ways intimacy develops. In Reis and Shaver's interpersonal process model, intimacy grows when one partner's self-disclosure is met with a response the discloser experiences as understanding, validating, and caring.

Brené Brown defines vulnerability as "uncertainty, risk, and emotional exposure." Brown goes on to suggest that vulnerability is our most accurate measure of courage; we allow ourselves to be seen when we are vulnerable. Brené Brown teaches her followers that vulnerability is typically thought of as the center of emotions, such as grief, shame, fear, and disappointment, but it is also the center and birthplace of love, belonging, authenticity, creativity, courage, and accountability.

Selective reinforcement and modeling has been used to help children learn from a young age how to regulate and take accountability for their emotions. Unpleasant emotional states are managed by their subjective discomfort. Emotional vulnerability is also impacted by respondents that express feelings of sadness about the uncertainty of climate change. Increasing awareness and impact leads to heightened emotional responses. In later life, the strength and vulnerability integration (SAVI) model holds that older adults become better at avoiding situations likely to upset them, but worse at coping physiologically when strong emotional arousal cannot be avoided and persists. Along with this, emotional vulnerability can affect the physical well-being of older adults when they suppress their emotions in highly distressing situations. When these vulnerabilities are supported through conversation with an emotionally safe "other," this vulnerability can lead to resilience and the capacity to support others.

=== Military ===
In military terminology, vulnerability is a subset of survivability, the others being susceptibility and recoverability. Vulnerability is defined in various ways depending on the nation and service arm concerned, but in general it refers to the near-instantaneous effects of a weapon attack. In aviation it is defined as the inability of an aircraft to withstand the damage caused by the man-made hostile environment. In some definitions, recoverability (damage control, firefighting, restoration of capability) is included in vulnerability. Some military services develop their own concept of vulnerability.

=== Political ===
Political vulnerability can be understood as "the weakness of the democratic system, with its negative effects on the efficiency of public policies, the legitimacy of the government action, limited participation of citizens and the private sector in national efforts, linkage with local governments and civil organizations, the handling and management of emergencies, processing of citizen's demands and needs, and the capacity to meet them." Democratic backsliding is a direct result of political vulnerability, and has been documented across the globe throughout history. Political vulnerability can also refer to elected officials' or political candidates' chances of election, with municipal and local elections often signifying a shift one way or the other on a national scale.

== Invulnerability ==
Invulnerability is a common feature found in science fiction and fantasy, particularly in superhero fiction, as depicted in novels, comic books and video games. In such stories, it is a quality that makes a character impervious to pain, damage or loss of health to a significant degree. There are many levels of invulnerability, just like there are many level of immortality (the highest level is absolute immortality), the attribute often coming with limitations leaving characters to be considered only "nigh-invulnerable". Many superheroes and supervillains in comic books have some degree of invulnerability, but it is often dependent on them having superhuman strength (aka Strength-Based Invulnerability), making how invulnerable they are correlate with their level of physical strength.

These kinds of characters possess a form of relative invulnerability, being practically impossible to harm by beings or forces less powerful than themselves. They are immune to most kinds of threats, but they can still be damaged or even killed by stronger characters or forces that specifically negate their invulnerability. Other characters may possess a form of selective or conditional invulnerability, being immune or highly resistant to certain harmful effects or other such phenomena while being vulnerable to others. These specific weaknesses are often enough to kill them as well as harm them, if not the only means to kill them. This can also come in the form of partial invulnerability, making a character highly resistant or immune to harm save for specific areas, such as internal organs.

In video games, it can be found in the form of "power-ups" or cheats; when activated via cheats, it is often referred to as "god mode". One of the best known examples is the IDDQD cheat code in the 1993 shooter Doom, which makes the player immune to nearly all damage. Generally, it does not protect the player from certain instant-death hazards, most notably "bottomless" pits from which, even if the player were to survive the fall, they would be unable to escape. As a rule, invulnerability granted by power-ups is temporary, and wears off after a set amount of time, while invulnerability cheats, once activated, remain in effect until deactivated, or the end of the level is reached. "Depending on the game in question, invulnerability to damage may or may not protect the player from non-damage effects, such as being immobilized or sent flying."

In mythology, talismans, charms, and amulets were created by magic users for the purpose of making the wearer immune to injury from both mystic and mundane weapons.

=== Adolescents ===
Hill, Duggan, and Lapsley state in their article that it is commonly accepted that teenagers have no regard for physical danger, which might indicate that they have a sense of danger invulnerability. Additionally, they predicted that the teenagers might have a sense of psychological invulnerability, or a sense of being able to remain unaffected by negative thoughts and emotions. In order to test the effects of both types of invulnerability, the researchers used the Adolescent Invulnerability Scale created by Lapsley and Hill in 2010, which includes twenty statements assessing to what extent the adolescents felt invulnerable psychologically and in danger situations.

Hill et al. found that having a sense of psychological invulnerability benefitted adolescents in combatting negative emotions such as depression. Adolescents who rated themselves as more psychologically invulnerable demonstrated more effective coping mechanisms during times of stress or depression. This led the researchers to believe that psychological invulnerability during adolescence is beneficial for identity formation.

Danger invulnerability highly correlated with illegal or criminal activity but had no correlation with mental health. However, danger invulnerability was able to effectively predict "delinquency, lifetime drug use, and drug use frequency." Gender differences in the data showed that adolescent males were more likely to feel invulnerable to danger and psychological effects. The researchers did not observe any difference between the ages of participants.

=== Emerging adults ===
Lapsley and Hill created the Adolescent Invulnerability Scale in part to study the invulnerability of college students in Arnett's emerging adulthood stage of life. Researchers predicted a positive correlation between the adolescents' and emerging adults' scores and subsequently found said correlation. They observed no significant differences in negative and positive optimism biases, which were other elements of the same study. But, as predicted, male participants scored higher on both areas of invulnerability.

High danger invulnerability strongly correlated with social issues, such as risk behavior and substance use. Both types of invulnerability, psychological and danger invulnerability, proved to be high predictors of self-esteem problems in emerging adulthood.

== See also ==
- Courage – Ability to deal with fear
- Gullibility – Failure of social intelligence
- Emergency management – Dealing with all humanitarian aspects of emergencies
- Emotional insecurity – Feeling of inadequacy
- Environmental Vulnerability Index – Measure of severity of environmental issues
- Exploitation of labour – Economic phenomenon
- Representativeness heuristic – Tool for assisting judgement in uncertainty
- True self and false self – Psychological concepts often used in connection with narcissism
- Vulnerabilities exploited by manipulators – Exploitative type of social influence
- Vulnerability and care theory of love – Canadian philosopher and psychologist
- Vulnerability in computing – Exploitable weakness in a computer system
- Vulnerability index – Measure of the exposure of a population to some hazard
- Vulnerable adult – Adult who is not able to care for themself
