= Hagnell =

Hagnell is a Swedish surname. Notable people with the surname include:

- Hans Hagnell (1919–2006), Swedish politician and economist
- Olle Hagnell (1924–2011), Swedish psychiatrist and epidemiologist, cousin of Hans

== See also ==
- Hignell
