= Emerging adulthood and early adulthood =

Phase of life following adolescence

Emerging adulthood, early adulthood, or post-adolescence refers to a phase of the life span between late adolescence and early adulthood, as initially proposed by Jeffrey Arnett in a 2000 article from American Psychologist. It primarily describes people living in developed countries, but it is also experienced by young adults in wealthy urban families in the Global South. The term describes young adults who do not have children, do not live in their own homes, and/or do not have sufficient income to become fully independent. Arnett suggests emerging adulthood is the distinct period between 18 and 29 years of age where young adults become more independent and explore various life possibilities.

Arnett argues that this developmental period can be isolated from adolescence and young adulthood, although the distinction between adolescence and young adulthood has remained largely unclear over the last several decades.

Emerging adulthood's state as a new demographic is continuously changing, although some believe that twenty-somethings have always struggled with "identity exploration, instability, self-focus, and feeling in-between." Arnett referred to emerging adulthood as a "roleless role" because emerging adults engage in a wide variety of activities without the constraint of any "role requirements". The developmental theory is highly controversial within the developmental field, and developmental psychologists argue over the legitimacy of Arnett's theories and methods.

Arnett would go on to serve as the executive director of the Society for the Study of Emerging Adulthood, a society dedicated to research on emerging adulthood.

== Distinction from young adulthood and adolescence ==
=== Terminology ===
One of the most important features of emerging adulthood is that this age period allows for the exploration in love, work, and worldviews, also known as the volitional years. Though the process of identity formation begins in adolescence, most of the formation occurs in emerging adulthood. This stage in life allows young individuals to develop characteristics that will help them become self-sufficient, engage in mature committed relationships, and obtain a level of education and training that will set them up for work during the adult years. Regarding love, although adolescents in the United States usually begin dating between ages 12 and 14, they usually view dating at this time as recreational. It is not until emerging adulthood that identity formation in love becomes more serious. Emerging adults consider their own developing identities as a reference point for a lifetime relationship partner, so they explore romantically and sexually as there is less parental control. While in the United States during adolescence, dating usually occurs in groups and in situations such as parties and dances and some shared sexual experiences. In emerging adulthood, relationships last longer and often include more permanent sexual relations as well as cohabitation.

Considering work: the majority of working adolescents in the United States tend to see their jobs as a way to make money for recreational activities rather than preparing them for a future career. In contrast, 18- to 25-year-olds in emerging adulthood view their jobs as a way to obtain the knowledge and skills that will prepare them for their future adulthood careers. Because emerging adults have the possibility of having numerous work experiences, they can consider the types of work they would like to pursue later in life. For emerging adults, it is common for worldviews to change as they explore jobs, interests, and their personal identity as they continue cognitive development

Those in emerging adulthood that choose to attend college often begin their college or university experience with a limited worldview developed during childhood and adolescence. However, emerging adults who attend college or university are often exposed to different worldviews that they may consider and eventually commit to. Their worldview often expands and changes because of their exposure to various cultures, life experiences, and individuals with whom they form connections. This expansion of worldview is due in part to the feature of identity exploration that is a central feature of emerging adulthood. This includes emerging adults who attend college, as well as those who do not.

Opposed to all of the stresses that commonly accompany this time of life, a defining quality that is constant among most emerging adults is optimism about the future. Americans between the ages of 18 and 24 were asked if they thought that their lives would be better or worse than their parents. 92% of this survey stated that they believed that their lives would be as good or better than their parents. Though reasons for optimism differ from socioeconomic status (SES) and ethnic backgrounds, generally emerging adults believe that they will have a happier family, or that they will have a higher paying job. Though for emerging adults it is not just about the idea of having a better job or more income that is the source of their optimism, it has also been traced back heavily to the belief that they will have a better balance between work and home then their parents have. This optimism is usually traced back to young adults having less experience with failure than their older counterparts.

Jeffrey Arnett gained powerful insights by interviewing individuals and listening to them. He found five unique characteristics in this stage of life, which are identity exploration, instability, self-focus, feeling in-between, and possibilities.

=== Five characteristics ===
Psychologist Jeffrey Arnett began interviewing young people about their lives in 1995. He interviewed 300 adults ages 18–29 throughout the United States over a five year span. While interviewing these young adults, he found that many of them in this age range had similar things to say about the stage of life they were in even though each participant was coming from different situations and environments. While interviewing young adults, Jeffrey Arnett found five repeated themes' characteristics as distinctive and pertinent to this stage of emerging adulthood. Below, these characteristics and why Jeffrey Arnett felt they distinguished this developmental period are discussed.

==== Age of identity exploration ====
The age of identity exploration is probably the "most distinctive characteristic of emerging adulthood." During this time of life, Arnett found that many of his participants were in a stage of trying to figure out who they are and who they want to be. They are trying to find out "what they want out of work, school and love" and experiment in each of those areas. "Through trying out these different possibilities, they develop a more definite identity, including an understanding of who they are, what their capabilities and limitations are, what their beliefs and values are, and how they fit into the society around them."

==== Age of instability ====
"As emerging adults explore different possibilities in love and work, their lives are often unstable." While interviewing emerging adults, Arnett found that moving back and forth from college to a legal guardian's home, becoming independent, or moving because of involvement with a romantic partner characterizes this stage of life. During this stage of life, work, school, and love are very unstable and susceptible to change. This is because people at this age have not had the chance yet to establish themselves in a career, and because of that they cannot afford a home or any other kind of place to settle down. Many may see this characteristic of emerging adulthood in a negative light, but it is "during this time [that] many young people obtain the level of education and training that will provide the foundation for their incomes and occupational achievements for the remainder of their adult work lives."

==== Age of self focus ====
In this stage, "emerging adults focus on themselves as they develop the knowledge, skills, and self-understanding they will need for adult life." Because those in this period of life have not settled down yet and do not have others depending on them, this is a time where they can grow in personal areas of their life, work on themselves, and do what they want for themselves without affecting others. According to Arnett, "Identity formation involves trying out various life possibilities and gradually moving toward making enduring decisions."

==== Age of feeling in between ====
Emerging adults "regard themselves as being neither adolescents nor adults, in between the two but not really one or the other." These emerging adults have control and independence, yet they may still be relying on their parent's insurance, housing, and groceries. They are able to do many things by themselves and hold their own lives, but are not at the stage where they can do it all.

==== Age of possibilities ====
This is a time when "many different futures remain possible." During this stage of life, young adults may be optimistic about their possibilities and opportunities. Without the responsibility of working for and providing for a family, young adults have the flexibility to try their hands at many things and find out what they like best. Interestingly, "most emerging adults believe they have a high standard of living "better than their parents did."

=== Subjective difference ===
When Americans between the ages of 18 and 25 are asked whether they believe they have reached adulthood, most do not answer with a "no" or a "yes", but answer with "In some respects yes, in some respects no." It is clear from this ambiguity that most emerging adults in the United States feel they have completed adolescence but not yet entered adulthood.

A number of studies have shown that regarding people in their late teens and early twenties in the United States, demographic qualities such as completing their education, finding a career, marrying, and becoming parents are not the criteria used in determining whether they have reached adulthood. Rather, the criteria that determine whether adulthood has been reached are certain characteristics, such as being able to make independent decisions and taking responsibility for one's self. In America, these qualities are usually experienced in the mid to late twenties, thus confirming that emerging adulthood is distinct subjectively.

=== Demographic distinctness ===
Emerging adulthood is the sole age period where there is nothing that is demographically consistent. As of 1997, over 95% of adolescents under the age of 20 in the United States lived at home with at least one parent. Additionally, 98% were not married, under 10% had become parents, and more than 95% attended school. Similarly, people in their thirties were also demographically normative: 75% were married, 75% were parents, and under 10% attended school. Residential status and school attendance are two reasons that the period of emerging adulthood is incredibly distinct demographically. Regarding residential status, emerging adults in the United States have very diverse living situations. About one third of emerging adults attended college and spend a few years living independently while partially relying on older, more established adults.

In contrast, 40% of emerging adults do not attend college but live independently and work full-time. Additionally, around 66% of emerging adults in the United States cohabitate with a romantic partner. Regarding school attendance, emerging adults are also extremely diverse in their educational paths (Arnett, 2000, p. 470–471). Over 60% of emerging adults in the United States enter college or university the year after graduating from high school. However, the years that follow college are incredibly diverse – only about 32% of 25- to 29-year-olds have finished four or more years of college. This diversity comes from differences in personality, culture, financial and relationship situations, and other circumstances. An emerging adult's experience may be very different from another emerging adult's experience. However, there tends to be a gap for emerging adulthood when students finish school and have yet to seek employment and romantic relationships.

This is because higher education is usually pursued non-continuously, where some pursue education while they also work, and some do not attend school for periods of time. Further contributing to the variance, about one third of emerging adults with bachelor's degrees pursue a postgraduate education within a year of earning their bachelor's degree. Because there is so much demographic instability, especially in residential status and school attendance, it is clear that emerging adulthood is a distinct entity based on its demographically non-normative qualities, at least in the United States. Some emerging adults end up moving back home after college graduation, which tests the demographic of dependency. During college, they may be completely independent, but that could quickly change afterward when they are trying to find a full-time job with little direction as to where to start their career. Only after self-efficiency has been reached and after a long period of freedom has experienced, that is when emerging adults will be ready to become adults and take on the full responsibility.

== Established adulthood ==
Established adulthood is the proposed range of approximately 30 to 45, complementing emerging adulthood. They are essentially a combination of the later years of young adulthood (30–35), extending to the early years of middle adulthood (40–45). It is described as the most challenging yet most rewarding phase of adulthood. Mehta et al. (2020) state that "During this period of the life span most adults must negotiate the intersecting demands of progressing in a chosen career, maintaining an intimate partnership, and caring for children. Successes or difficulties in meeting these simultaneous demands have the potential to profoundly influence the direction of a person's adult life." There are also other challenges that take place in established adulthood namely the continuation or resolution of the states that began in emerging adulthood. The challenges that the established adult must face are these: the solidifying of their identity, lower work prospects, needing to focus on others, the continuation of stress from the previous stage evolved to this stage, and actually feeling like an adult. Although these are a continuation of the previous stages, they indicate a solidification of a person within established adulthood and opens doors to new experiences not previously available to the person, these can include better habits and higher intelligence.

== History ==
In the United States during the early 1960s, the average age that young adults were marrying was 20 for women and 23 for men, which means young adulthood consisted of parenthood and continuing higher education. Young women concentrated on becoming full-time mothers, whereas men focused on their careers while parenthood took a backseat. In the 1970s, the average age for childbirth began increasing; by 2010, it rose to 26 years for women and 28 for men. As of 2021, the median age for marriage (not including re-marriage) was 28 for women and 30 for men. In the past, marriage and child-rearing have been considered the pivotal hallmarks of being an adult. As such, average ages of marriage and child-bearing can indicate when individuals are reaching "adulthood". As the average ages for marriage and child-bearing have increased, they indicate the time in which emerging adulthood began developing as an additional stage in adult development.

Jeffrey Arnett pointed out four revolutions that changed everything people knew in the 1960s and 70s and contributed to the existence of the emerging adulthood stages of life—the technology revolution, the sexual revolution, the women's movement, and the youth movement. Each of these movements led to impacts on the actions and development of people in separate ways. However, the culmination of all of these events led to the characteristics of emerging adulthood as a stage listed above.

=== Technology revolution ===
The technology revolution refers to a change in Western cultures where a rise in technology development eliminated some jobs and created others. This revolution transformed the United States (and other industrializing economies) from manufacturing economies to knowledge and skill-based economies. Jobs became outsourced to other countries, which eliminated most of the entry-level jobs that young adults used to hold to enter the workforce. With the development of technology like computers, people were needed to help with the operation and support of this tech as it was integrated into the American economy. These jobs generated usually required high-level education. Thus, while jobs were generated by the rise in technology, these jobs tended to be generated in urban areas. As a result, many in rural areas struggled to find jobs. Any jobs that were available required more schooling. This prompted younger adults to spend more and more time in school rather than working full-time or starting families. Other positions outside of technology also started requiring some sort of post-secondary credentials for their jobs, contributing to young adults spending more time in school. Because of this, typical hallmarks of adulthood like marriage, child-bearing, and home ownership were delayed. These are characteristics generally associated with "full-on" adulthood. As those characteristics had yet to be reached, adults within this stage did not seem to fit the standards.

=== Sexual revolution ===
The sexual revolution describes a change in attitudes and actions regarding sex in Western cultures. It came to a head in the early 1960s, leading to emerging adulthood as a stage. This was due to young adults having sexual relations or children before marriage. While it came to a head in the 1960s, the sexual revolution started long before. It had its roots in 18th century philosophers that wrote in argument of sexual freedom. Many of those texts were censored as they were considered inappropriate for the time. It was until later that some of these texts were published, for example, Fourier's A New World of Love was finally published in 1967. These served to fan the flames. This movement finally coming to a head in the 1960s was in part due to the development of more effective methods of contraception. For example, in 1964, birth control became another option for young adults. The risk of children resulting from a sexual encounter was no longer a concern. This change of views regarding the use of sex resulted in young adults postponing marriage and parenthood age back a few years, changing the early and mid-twenties from a time of married relationships to a time of non-committed sexual relationships. Younger adults were no longer leaving home to get married. There was pushback against marriage as an institution due to contrasting views from some populations that it was sexist and homophobic in its practice. Marriage became less and less of a standard or "pre-requisite" of adulthood. Because of this, this stage of life was no longer characterized by the responsibilities and organization of marriage, leaving younger adults in qualitatively different relationships than before.

While the sexual revolution is often viewed in a negative light in terms of marriage and relationships, it also had many benefits to society. For example, sexual knowledge increased, there were advancements in birth control, and stigma towards menstruation significantly decreased . While decreasing stigmatism and taboo around sex as well as promoting sexual freedom, the sexual revolution also opened up the world to other important topics such as oppression, inequality, and exploitation doi:10.5860/choice.37-3498. Another significant benefit that occurred because of the sexual revolution is the discussion of sexual boundaries and the setting of these boundaries with consent. This sexual revolution began in the 1960s, but is an ongoing movement that promotes sexual health, rights and diversity despite persisting challenges .

=== Women's movement ===
The women's movement also contributed to the development of emerging adulthood. This movement describes a change in expected roles of women and life opportunities available. Before and during the 1960s, their expected roles were to find a husband and bear children and become full-time housewives, but the social roles of women were altered as a result of the women's movement: they transitioned from the expectation of being mothers to being active members of the workforce, while still being supported as mothers. This movement pushed for equality between women and men. Thanks to pivotal work by feminist and individualistic groups, opportunities opened, and women began to seek options for careers and education that were uncommon in the 1960s. Because of these opportunities, women no longer need to rely on men and husbands to have a source of income anymore. More opportunities developed as more women spent their emerging adulthood years (approximately ages 18–29) pursuing careers and higher education rather than settling down and starting families. The women's movement, in conjunction with the sexual revolution and a devaluation of marriage, contributed to the delay in getting married. Women were delaying having children in order to pursue an education without the responsibility of raising children at the same time. The delay in participating in previous cornerstone aspects of adulthood supported the development of emerging adulthood. As most people (men and women) were then pushing off characteristics of full adulthood, this warranted an establishment of this new stage of life.

=== Youth movement ===
This movement represented a shift in the cultural attitudes and perceptions of adulthood in Western cultures. Previous to this movement in the 1960s and 1970s, many young people aspired to grow up and become adults who were considered wise, in control, and independent. Adulthood as a stage was something to desire to achieve. However, the youth movement changed perceptions of adulthood to be less favorable than those of youth. Music and phrases reflected the growing movement to celebrate youth and renounce aging. For example, phrases like "I want to be forever young" and "never trust adults" became increasingly common, and youth began to prevail over wisdom, associated with aging, in terms of popularity. Many youth groups developed at the beginning of the 20th century in several Western countries. One example was the Boy Scouts of America. These youth groups supported the development of the youth movement by idolizing the opportunities and qualities of youth. Because of this idolization of being young, young adults postponed adulthood and prolonged their youth into their twenties by living independently of conditions and characteristics associated with adulthood, like marriage and child-rearing. The delay of adulthood and popularization of remaining young brought about by this revolution led to the development of emerging adulthood. The youth movement, in conjunction with the technology revolution, sexual revolution, and women's movement, were thought to have contributed to the development of emerging adulthood as a stage of life by Arnett.

== Physiological development ==
=== Biological changes ===
Emerging adulthood and adolescence differ significantly with regard to puberty and hormonal development. While there is considerable overlap between the onset of puberty and the developmental stage referred to as adolescence, there are considerably fewer hormonal and physical changes taking place in individuals between the ages of 18 and 25. Emerging adults have reached a stage of full hormonal maturity and are fully, physically equipped for sexual reproduction.

Emerging adulthood is usually thought of as a time of peak physical health and performance as individuals are usually less susceptible to disease and more physically agile during this period than in later stages of adulthood. However, emerging adults are generally more likely to contract sexually transmitted infections, as well as to adopt unhealthy behavioral patterns and lifestyle choices.

Personality organizations will have increased instability during this stage and after will have increased stability. This will help us understand personality development through the years. Social dominance, emotional stability, and conscientiousness increased more in this stage and during this time social vitality decreased. This is compared to changes in later adulthood. Emerging adults develop the ability to move away from spontaneous behavior to more stability and better self-control. This self-control that develops during this stage includes life planning, being reflective, intentional, and more cautious. Emerging adults will trust in themselves to create strategies that will completely guide them in their lives. They will experience a rise in their sense of their successes and social power and will reflect on what they have gained from meeting challenges such as the school-to-work challenge.

=== Cognitive development ===
The human body continues to develop while in emerging adulthood; particularly the brain. While some may believe that the brains of emerging adults are fully formed, they are in fact still developing. Many connections within the brain are strengthened and those that are unused are pruned away. Several brain structures develop that allow for greater processing of emotions and social information. Areas of the brain used for planning and processing risk and rewards also undergo important developments during this stage. These developments in brain structure and the resulting implications are one factor that leads emerging adults to be considered more mature than adolescents. This is due to the fact that they make fewer impulsive decisions and rely more on planning and evaluating of situations. Though emerging adults have not lived as long as older adults they tend to have better solutions to problems than older adults because of higher mental flexibility, which helps emerging adults to generate a greater number of solutions to a given problem. This shows that practical intelligence is prominent during emerging adulthood.

Shulman et al. found that tendencies of emerging adults differ between sexes. Risk-taking behaviors are often engaged in by males during the adolescent period and may continue through emerging adulthood. These tendencies will, however, decrease as the individual progresses in age and as the neurobiological need to engage in sensation-seeking activities and impulsivity reduces. Studies show that tendencies of women to engage in risk-taking behavior often occur earlier in life when compared with men which may be linked with pubertal development. After reaching the peak of impulsivity and sensation-seeking behaviors women will often decline rapidly in their need to engage in these behaviors whereas men will steadily taper off as they develop gradual impulse control.

While brain structures continue to develop during emerging adulthood, the cognition of emerging adults is an area that receives the majority of attention. Arnett explains, "Emerging adulthood is a critical stage for the emergence of complex forms of thinking required in complex societies." Crucial changes take place in their sense of self and capacity for self-reflection. At this stage, emerging adults often decide on a particular worldview and are able to recognize that other perspectives exist and are valid as well. While cognition generally becomes more complex, education level plays an important role in this development. Not all emerging adults reach the same advanced level in cognition because of the variety of education received during this age period.

It is a common misconception that the brains of young adults, particularly 25 and under, are immature.

=== Abnormal development ===
Much research has been directed at studying the onset of lifetime DSM disorders to dispel the common thought that most disorders begin earlier in life. Because of this reasoning, many people that show signs of disorders do not seek help due to its stigmatization. The research shows that those with various disorders will not feel symptoms until emerging adulthood. Kessler and Merikangas reported that "50% of emerging adults between the ages of 18 and 25 experience at least one psychiatric disorder." Not only is the emergence of various disorders prevalent in emerging adulthood, but the chance of developing a disorder drastically decreases at age 28.

Seventy-five percent of any lifetime DSM-V anxiety, mood, impulse-control, and substance abuse disorder begins before age 24. Most onsets at this age will not be, or become, comorbid. The median onset interquartile range of substance use disorders is 18–27, while the median onset age is 20. The median onset age of mood disorders is 25.

Even disorders that begin earlier, like schizophrenia spectrum diagnoses, can reveal themselves within the developmental stage of emerging adulthood. Often, patients will not seek help until several years of symptoms have passed, if at all. For example, those diagnosed with social anxiety disorder will rarely seek treatment until age 27 or later. Typically, symptoms of more severe disorders, such as major depression, begin at age 25 as well. Depression symptoms are higher in the 20s compared to the older generation with the exclusion of the 80s. The negative effect is also higher in the 20s but it will hit a peak then the negative effect will decrease.

With the exception of some phobias, symptoms of many disorders begin to appear and are diagnosable during emerging adulthood. Major efforts have been taken to educate the public and influence those with symptoms to seek treatment past adolescence. There is minimal but intriguing evidence that those who attend college appear to have less of a chance of showing symptoms of DSM-IV disorders. In one study, they were less prone to drug abuse and dependence and their mental health was better in college students. However, other research reports that chance of alcohol abuse and addiction is increased with college student status.

== Relationships ==
=== Parent-child relationship ===
Emerging adulthood is characterized by a reevaluation of the parent-child relationship, primarily in regard to autonomy. As a child switches from the role of a dependent to the role of a fellow adult, the family dynamic changes significantly. At this stage, it is important that parents acknowledge and accept their child's status as an adult. This process may include gestures such as allowing increased amounts of privacy and extending trust. Granting this recognition assists the increasingly independent offspring in forming a strong sense of identity and exploration at a time when it is most crucial.

There is varied evidence regarding the continuity of emerging adults' relationships with parents, although most of the research supports the fact that there is moderate stability. A parent-child relationship of higher quality often results in greater affection and contact in emerging adulthood. Attachment styles tend to remain stable from infancy to adulthood. An initial secure attachment assists in healthy separation from parents while still retaining intimacy, resulting in adaptive psychological function. Changes in attachment are often associated with negative life events, as described below.

Divorce and remarriage of parents often result in a weaker parent-child relationship, even if no adverse effects were apparent during childhood. When parental divorce occurs in early adulthood, it has a strong, negative impact on the child's relationship with their father.

However, if parents and children maintain a good relationship throughout the divorce process, it could act as a buffer and reduce the negative effects of the experience. A positive parent-child relationship after parental divorce may also be facilitated by the child's understanding of divorce. Understanding the complexity of the situation and not dwelling on the negative aspects may actually assist a young adult's adjustment, as well as their success in their own romantic relationships.

Despite the increasing need for autonomy that emerging adults experience, there is also a continuing need for support from parents, although this need is often different and less dependent than that of children and earlier adolescents. Many people over the age of 18 still require financial support in order to further their education and career, despite an otherwise independent lifestyle. Furthermore, emotional support remains important during this transition period. Parental engagement with low marital conflict results in better adjustment for college students. This balance of autonomy and dependency may seem contradictory, but relinquishing control while providing necessary support may strengthen the bond between parents and offspring and may even provide space for children to be viewed as sources of support.

Parental support may come in the form of co-residence, which has varied effects on an emerging adult's adjustment. The proportion of young adults living with their parents has steadily increased in recent years, largely due to financial strain, difficulty finding employment, and the necessity of higher education in the job field. The economic benefit of a period of co-residence may assist an emerging adult in exploration of career options. In households with lower socioeconomic status, this arrangement may have the added benefit of the young adult providing support for the family, both financially and otherwise.

Co-residence can also have negative effects on an emerging adult's adjustment and autonomy. This may hinder parents' ability to acknowledge their child as an adult, While home-leaving promotes psychological growth and satisfying adult-to-adult relationships with parents characterized by less confrontation. Living in physically separate households can help both a young adult and a parent acknowledge the changing nature of their relationship.

Arnett argues that the title of "young adulthood" is ineffective because it implies that adulthood has already been met, including independence and autonomy. Parents that intervened regarding situations of employment and education for their children that live outside of their home decreased advancements of their child towards adulthood and independence. In contrast, parents who were in the shadows for their children, willing to help if there was a dire need, but allowed for autonomy and problem-solving in their developing adult had a stronger relationship with their child.

=== Romantic relationships ===
Serious romantic relationships often begin to occur in adulthood. Data on participants in a German longitudinal study indicated that 43% of middle adolescents and 47% of late adolescents reported romantic relationships compared to 63% in emerging adulthood. Emerging adulthood relationships carried on for an average of 21.3 months compared to adolescence, which averaged at 5.1 and 11.8 months. Montgomery and Sorell (1994) did a study on romantic love and it reported that unmarried emerging adults would be more dominating, clingy, possessive, and dependent compared to young and married couples who have an altruistic selfless love. Emerging adults had less satisfaction in their relationships. Emerging adults also tended to cohabit with their romantic partners, which helped with their finances and housing situations. Cohabitation usually led to marriage. Data shows that 60% of American emerging adults will live with a partner, and over half of cohabitation relationships result in marriage. Biological factors could come into play as well regarding the emerging adult relationships that do work out such as problem-solving behavior in order to reproduce. It is possible that lack of experience is what leads many emerging adults to failing in their relationships, however this biological aid as well as the individuals involved could be what is leading to the success of some of these relationships.

=== Sexual relationships ===
There are a wide variety of factors that influence sexual relationships during emerging adulthood; this includes beliefs about certain sexual behaviors and marriage. For example, among emerging adults in the United States, it is common for oral sex to not be considered "real sex." In the 1950s and 1960s, about 75% of people between the ages of 20–24 engaged in premarital sex. Today, that number is 90%. Unintended pregnancy and sexually transmitted infections and diseases (STIs/STDs) are a central issue. As individuals move through emerging adulthood, they are more likely to engage in monogamous sexual relationships and practice safe sex.

Across most OECD (Organisation for Economic Co-operation and Development) countries, marriage rates are falling, the age at first marriage is rising, and cohabitation among unmarried couples is increasing. The Western European marriage pattern has traditionally been characterized by marriage in the mid-twenties, especially for women, with a generally small age difference between the spouses, a significant proportion of women who remain unmarried, and the establishment of a neolocal household after the couple has married.

Housing affordability has been linked to home ownership rates, and demographic researchers have argued for a link between the rising age at first marriage and the rising age of first home ownership.

=== Friendships ===
Friendships are a resource that helps emerging adults help master this developmental stage of tasks. During emerging adulthood, friendships sometimes will be more important than your family relationships. Shulman (1975) found that when emerging adults (18–30) were asked who was in their personal networks 41% were more likely to put down friends instead of family members. Emerging adults have reported that they have less positive feelings with their siblings, but have positive feelings with their friends. There was a study done on single emerging adults, that reported their most preferred companions were friends, especially if the emerging adult has no partner and no longer fully relies on their parents.

Friendships seem to broaden as one enters into emerging adulthood. They tend to become more diverse if put in the position to become so, as well as more willing to have friends of the opposite-sex. Romantic relationships in emerging adulthood tend to affect the necessity and importance of friendships. Those who are single or dating tend to hold their friends to a higher importance while those in relationships have an increase in time spent with their friends at the beginning of a relationship but then gradually decrease the amount of time spent with their friends as the relationship continues. Although those in emerging adulthood use their friends as a safe haven, the presence of a romantic partner will decrease this use of friendship while the use of the significant other as a safe haven is more likely.

== Gender differences ==
Several changes occur throughout adolescence and emerging adulthood. Adolescents begin to learn and use coping strategies in order to navigate the choices and crises of emerging adulthood. During emerging adulthood, males and females both use problem-solving-oriented coping most often. Males take a more passive approach to coping with the choices and adjustments of emerging adulthood, and females take on a more active approach. Females are more focused on quickly learning and adapting to adulthood. Men feel more pressure to succeed in academic ways and create a successful life whereas women feel more of a pull towards family and children.

== Culture ==
Of the world population in 2016 (7.5 billion), 6.1 billion people, or 80%, lived in developing economies. Demographers distinguish between developing countries and the economically advanced, industrialized nations that form the Organisation for Economic Co-operation and Development (OECD). This includes countries and regions like the United States, Canada, Western Europe, Japan, South Korea, and Australia, all of which have significantly higher median incomes and educational attainment and significantly lower rates of illness, disease, and early death.

The theory of emerging adulthood is specifically applicable to cultures within these OECD nations, and as a stage of development has only emerged over the past half-century. It is specific to "certain cultural-demographic conditions, specifically widespread education, and training beyond secondary school and entry into marriage and parenthood in the early or late thirties or beyond."

Furthermore, emerging adulthood occurs only within societies that allow for occupational shifts, with emerging adults often experiencing frequent job changes before settling on a particular job by the age of 30. Arnett also argues that emerging adulthood happens in cultures that allow for a period of time between adolescence and marriage, the marker of adulthood. Such marital and occupational instability found among emerging adults can be attributed to the strong sense of individualization found in cultures that allow for this stage of development; in individualized cultures, traditional familial and institutional constraints have become less pronounced than in previous times or in non-industrialized or developing cultures, allowing for more personal freedom in life decisions. However, emerging adulthood even occurs in industrialized nations that do not value individualization, as is the case in some Asian countries discussed below.

Up until the latter portion of the 20th century in OECD countries, and contemporarily in developing countries around the world, young people made the transition from adolescence to young adulthood around or by the age of 22, when they settled into long-lasting, obligation-filled familial and occupational roles. Therefore, in societies where this trend still prevails, emerging adulthood does not exist as a widespread stage of development.

Among OECD countries, there is a general "one size fits all" model in regard to emerging adulthood, having all undergone the same demographic changes that resulted in this new stage of development between adolescence and young adulthood. However, the shape emerging adulthood takes can even vary between different OECD countries, and researchers have only recently begun exploring such cross-national differences. For instance, researchers have determined that Europe is the area where emerging adulthood lasts the longest, with high levels of government assistance and median marriage ages nearing 30, compared to the U.S. where the median marriage age is 27.

Emerging adult communities in East Asia may be most dissimilar from their European and American counterparts, for while they share the benefits of affluent societies with strong education and welfare systems, they do not share as strong a sense of individualization. Historically and currently, East Asian cultures have emphasized collectivism more so than those in the West. For instance, while Asian emerging adults similarly engage in individualistic identity exploration and personal development, they do so within more restrictive boundaries set by familial obligation. For example, European and American emerging adults consistently list financial independence as a key marker of adulthood, while Asian emerging adults consistently list capable of supporting parents financially as a marker with equal weight. Some Asian emerging adults feel that getting married is a step only after school is finished and parents are cared for. Furthermore, while casual dating and premarital sex has become normative in the West, in Asia parents still discourage such practices, where they remain "rare and forbidden." In fact, about 75% of emerging adults in the U.S. and Europe report having had premarital sexual relations by the age of 20, whereas less than 20% in Japan and South Korea reported the same.

While emerging adulthood exemplars are found mainly within the middle and upper classes of OECD countries, the stage of development still seems to occur across classes, with the main difference between different ones being length—on average, young people in lower social classes tend to enter adulthood two years before those in upper classes.

While emerging adulthood occurs on a wide scale only in OECD countries, developing countries may also exhibit similar phenomena in certain population subgroups. In contrast to those in poor or rural parts of developing nations, who have no emerging adulthood and sometimes no adolescence due to comparatively early entry into marriage and adult-like work, young people in wealthier urban classes have begun to enter stages of development that resemble emerging adulthood, and the amount to do so is rising. Such individuals may develop a bicultural or hybrid identity, with part of themselves identifying with local culture and another part participating in the professional culture of the global economy. One finds examples of such a situation among the middle-class young people in India, who lead the globalized economic sector while still, for the most part, preferring to have arranged marriages and take care of their parents in old age. While it is more common for emerging adulthood to occur in OECD countries, it is not always true that all young people in those societies have the opportunity to experience these years of change and exploration.

A study done by Shulman et al. (2009), followed students in two preparatory academies in Israel and examined personality and support. They found that family support was a strong contributing factor to a successful adulthood adjustment. Emerging adults that were self-critical had more difficulty in academic success, had an increase in negative life struggles, and were less motivated to achieve their goals. An Eastern culture that focuses more, on the whole, is more likely to put pressure on emerging adults.

== Media ==
Emerging adulthood is not just an idea being talked about by psychologists, the media has propagated the concept as well. Hollywood has produced multiple movies where the main conflict seems to be a "grown" adult's reluctance to actually "grow" up and take on responsibility. Failure to Launch and Step Brothers are extreme examples of this concept. While most take on emerging adulthood (and the problems that it can cause) are shown in a light-humored attempt to poke fun at the idea, a few films have taken a more serious approach to the plight. Adventureland, Take Me Home Tonight, Cyrus and Jeff, Who Lives at Home are comedy-dramas that exhibit the plight of today's emerging adult. Television also is capitalizing on the concept of emerging adulthood with sitcoms such as $#*! My Dad Says and Big Lake.

However, it is not just on television that society sees the world becoming aware of this trend. In spring 2010, The New Yorker magazine showcased a picture of a post-grad hanging his PhD on the wall of his bedroom as his parents stood in the doorway. People do not have to seek out these media sources to find documentation of the emerging adulthood phenomenon. News sources about the topic are abundant. Nationwide, it is being found that people entering their 20s are faced with multitudes of living problems for which this age group has become noteworthy. The Occupy movement is an example of what has happened to the youth of today and exhibits the frustration of today's emerging adults. Other television shows and films showcasing emerging/early adulthood are Girls, How I Met Your Mother, and Less than Zero.

== Criticism ==
The concept of emerging adulthood has not been without its critiques, which are centered on key aspects of life such as socioeconomic status/class, cultural values, and the current values and developmental theories of today.

First, sociologists have pinpointed that emerging adulthood neglects to address class differences. While it can be generalized that middle-class children in Western societies can afford to postpone life decisions; young adults within a lower class may have no choice at all, and stay in the parental home not because they want to, but because they cannot afford a life of their own: They experience a period of "arrested adulthood."

Second, emerging adulthood appears to only apply to specific people in specific cultures. Western cultures are more likely to focus on stages such as emerging adulthood because of their focus on individuality. Eastern cultures are more focused on the whole and are taught to have less individual exploration and expression. Therefore, the theory has no bearing if it is specific to a single demographic.

Third, a group of developmental psychologists, regard all stage theories as outdated. provide theoretical criticism. They argue that development is a dynamic interactive process, which is different for every individual because every individual has their own experiences. By inventing this additional stage, Arnett only describes (not explains) a time period in life for individuals within industrialized countries as opposed to developing countries and cannot be considered a scientific approach.

Moreover, this stage of life has nothing to say about people living in different conditions or at different points in history; essentially, the critique is that emerging adulthood is too specific for the current time period. This theory is not one that could fit all of the past generations. Because of movements such as the technology revolution, the sexual revolution, the women's movement, and the youth movement, it is a distinct time period. This criticism is not that it has no bearing as a theory, but that it is too specific to the recent young generations based on environmental factors specific to the modern day.

Arnett has taken up some of these critical points in public discussion such as in "Debating Emerging Adulthood: Stage or Process" in which he and Jennifer Tanner debate this theory with Marion Kloep and Leo Hendry who argue against its validity.

== See also ==
- Quarter-life crisis
- Suicide among LGBT youth
- Waithood
- Youth culture
- Youth politics
- Youth rights
- Youth suicide
