= Amy Janes =

American psychiatry researcher

Academic background
- Education: Boston University
- Thesis: Type 4 Phosphodiesterases and Cocaine-induced Sensitization in Mice (2007)
- Website: janeslab.org

Amy Janes is an American psychiatry researcher. She is chief of the Cognitive and Pharmacological Neuroimaging Unit at the National Institute on Drug Abuse's Intramural Research Program. She is known for her work using multimodal neuroimaging to examine individual differences and potential therapeutics in addictive and substance use disorders. Prior to joining NIDA, Janes was an associate professor at Harvard Medical School, working at McLean Hospital, where she founded the Functional Integration of Addiction Research Laboratory.

== Education and career ==
In 2001 Janes received a B.A. from Rutgers University. In 2003 she received an M.A. from Boston University, going on to complete her Ph.D. there in 2007. She then joined the faculty at McLean Hospital in 2007, remaining until 2021 when she joined NIDA.

== Professional honors and duties ==
Janes has been awarded numerous professional honors, including:

- 2010, Alfred Pope Award for Young Investigators
- 2019, Presidential Early Career Award for Scientists and Engineers
- 2020, Anne M. Cataldo Excellence in Mentoring
- 2023, NIDA Women in Science, Research Recognition Award

She is the principal editor of Human Psychopharmacology: Experimental, and was the 2022-2023 president of the College on Problems of Drug Dependence.

== Research ==
Janes's work in clinical neuroimaging research focuses on substance use disorders. Her research primarily utilizes multimodal neuroimaging techniques to explore various aspects of addiction, including identifying individual vulnerabilities to addiction, evaluating the impact of potential therapeutics on brain function, investigating the interplay between psychiatric disorders and nicotine dependence, and advancing the basic neuroscience understanding of substance use disorders. Her long-term objective is to use neuroscience in guiding the creation of personalized treatments for substance abuse disorders.

== Selected publications ==
Janes has more than 2,400 citations in Google Scholar and an h-index of 29.

- Janes, A. C.; Pizzagalli, D. A.; Richardt, S.; Frederick, B. D.; Chuzi, S.; Pachas, G.; Culhane, M. A.; Holmes, A. J.; Fava, M.; Evins, A. E.; Kaufman, M. J. (1 December 2009). "Brain Reactivity to Smoking Cues Prior to Smoking Cessation Predicts Ability to Maintain Tobacco Abstinence". Biol Psychiatry. 67 (8). Elsevier: 722–729. doi:10.1016/j.biopsych.2009.12.034. PMC 2954596. PMID 20172508.
- Janes, A. C.; Nickerson, L.; Frederick, B. D.; Kaufman, M. J. (1 February 2012). "Prefrontal and limbic resting state brain network functional connectivity differs between nicotine-dependent smokers and non-smoking controls". Drug Alcohol Depend. 125 (3). Elsevier: 252–259. doi:10.1016/j.drugalcdep.2012.02.020. PMC 3389311. PMID 22459914.
- Janes, Amy C.; Pizzagalli, Diego A.; Richardt, Sarah; Frederick, Blaise de B.; Holmes, Avram J.; Sousa, Jessica; Fava, Maurizio; Evins, A Eden; Kaufman, Marc J. (18 March 2010). "Neural substrates of attentional bias for smoking-related cues: an FMRI study". Neuropsychopharmacology. 35 (12). Nature Publishing Group: 2339–2345. doi:10.1038/npp.2010.103. PMC 2955848. PMID 20703221.
- Putcha, Deepti; Ross, Robert S.; Cronin-Golomb, Alice; Janes, Amy C.; Stern, Chantal E. (1 January 2015). "Altered intrinsic functional coupling between core neurocognitive networks in Parkinson's disease". NeuroImage: Clinical. 7. Elsevier: 449–455. doi:10.1016/j.nicl.2015.01.012. PMC 4320252. PMID 25685711.

== Personal life ==
Janes is married to Robert Ross, a professor at Johns Hopkins University. She is the daughter of Harry Janes, emeritus professor at Rutgers University.
