= Deborah Hasin =

American psychiatrist epidemiologist and academic

Deborah S. Hasin
- Education: University of California, Los Angeles; Columbia University
- Scientific career
- Workplaces: Columbia University; New York State Psychiatric Institute
- Thesis: Evaluation methods in psychiatric epidemiology : a comparison of contrasting approaches (1986)

Deborah Hasin is an American psychiatric epidemiologist who works at Columbia University. Her research considers psychiatric disorders associated with drug and alcohol addiction. She is the former President of the American Psychopathological Association and College on Problems of Drug Dependence.In 2024 and 2025 Dr. Hasin worked with the reporters at the New York Times to help them understand the risks of cannabis use disorder. The report was published in the New York Times.

== Early life and education ==
Hasin studied at the University of California, Los Angeles, where she completed a bachelor's degree in music. She became a substitute science teacher in the Madison Metropolitan School District and an employment counsellor in New Haven, Connecticut. In Connecticut, she earned a master's in social work and epidemiology. She worked in New Haven as a psychiatric aide, where she was first inspired to work with patients with psychiatric disorders. She eventually settled in New York City, where she worked at the New York State Psychiatric Institute. She was a graduate student at Columbia University, where she held a fellowship in psychiatric epidemiology. Her doctorate explored evaluation methods in psychiatric epidemiology. She was supported by the National Institute on Alcohol Abuse and Alcoholism from 1990.

== Research and career ==
Hasin has studied psychiatric disorders that are associated with addiction. She uses longitudinal studies to understand the direction of an effect. She released the Psychiatric Research Interview for Substance and Mental Disorders, which provided clinicians with a strategy to diagnose substance disorders. She created a questionnaire, which can be adapted for specific substances, to separate psychiatric symptoms from withdrawal symptoms. For example, the questionnaire can assess opioid disorders amongst patients. At Columbia she directs the Substance Dependence Research Group.

She has worked with the Veterans Health Administration to evaluate how social acceptability impacts drug use. She is interested in how the evolving cannabis laws affect the use of cannabis and prevalence of cannabis use disorder. She has argued that cannabis use disorder has increased in prevalence since the legislation changed, and that public health consideration has been ignored in discussions around changing laws.

Hasin served as President of the American Psychological Association in 2020. She was awarded the APA Hamilton President’s Award in 2020. In 2023, she was made President of the College on Problems of Drug Dependence.

== Selected publications ==
- Deborah S Hasin; Frederick S Stinson; Elizabeth Ogburn; Bridget F Grant (1 July 2007). "Prevalence, correlates, disability, and comorbidity of DSM-IV alcohol abuse and dependence in the United States: results from the National Epidemiologic Survey on Alcohol and Related Conditions". JAMA Psychiatry. 64 (7): 830–842. doi:10.1001/archpsyc.64.7.830. ISSN 2168-622X. PMID 17606817. Wikidata Q34645025.
- Bridget F. Grant; Risë B. Goldstein; Tulshi D Saha; et al. (1 August 2015). "Epidemiology of DSM-5 Alcohol Use Disorder: Results From the National Epidemiologic Survey on Alcohol and Related Conditions III". JAMA Psychiatry. 72 (8): 757–766. doi:10.1001/jamapsychiatry.2015.0584. ISSN 2168-622X. PMC 5240584. PMID 26039070. S2CID 13790775. Wikidata Q37589721.
- Roman Kotov; Robert F Krueger; David Watson; et al. (23 March 2017). "The Hierarchical Taxonomy of Psychopathology (HiTOP): A dimensional alternative to traditional nosologies". Journal of Abnormal Psychology. 126 (4): 454–477. doi:10.1037/abn0000258. ISSN 1939-1846. PMID 28333488. S2CID 207662415. Wikidata Q39195706.
