= Robert D. Gibbons =

American statistician

- Born: June 28, 1955 (age 71)
- Occupation: Blum-Riese Professor of Biostatistics

Academic background
- Education: University of Denver
- Alma mater: University of Chicago

Academic work
- Discipline: Statistician
- Sub-discipline: Biostatistics, environmental statistics, psychometrics
- Institutions: The University of Chicago

Robert D. Gibbons is a professor in the field of statistics, with expertise in biostatistics, environmental statistics, and psychometrics. He holds the position of Blum-Riese Professor and Pritzker Scholar at the University of Chicago, with appointments in the Departments of Medicine, Public Health Sciences (Biostatistics), and Comparative Human Development. Gibbons is a Fellow of the American Statistical Association, the International Statistical Institute, and the Royal Statistical Society, and a member of the National Academy of Medicine of the National Academy of Sciences. He has made contributions to statistical work spanning areas such as longitudinal data analysis, item response theory, environmental statistics, and drug safety, with over 350 peer-reviewed scientific papers and several books to his name.

== Education ==
- Ph.D. (Statistics and Psychometrics), University of Chicago, 1981
- B.A. (Chemistry and Mathematics), University of Denver, 1976

== Selected Publications ==
- Gibbons R.D., Meltzer D., Duan N., Penhoet E.D., Dubler N.N., Francis C.K., Gill, B., Guinan E., Henderson M., Ildstad S.T., King, P.A., Martinez-Maldonado M., Mclain G.E., Murray J.E., Nelkin D. Spellman M.W, Pope A. and Pitluck S. Waiting for Organ Transplantation, Science, 287, 237-238, 2000.
- Bhaumik D.K., Amatya A., Normand S.L., Greenhouse J, .Kaizar E., Neelon B., Gibbons R.D. Metaanalysis of rare binary adverse event data. Journal of the American Statistical Association, 107, 555-567, 2012.
- Gibbons R.D., Hur K., Lavigne J., Wang J., Mann J.J. Medications and Suicide: High Dimensional Empirical Bayes Screening (iDEAS). Harvard Data Science Review, 1(2), 2019.
- Gibbons R.D. and Bhaumik D. Weighted random-effects regression models with application to interlaboratory calibration. Technometrics, 43, 192-198, 2001.
- Gibbons R.D., & Hedeker D.R. Full-information item bi-factor analysis. Psychometrika, 57, 423-436, 1992.
- Gibbons R.D., Hur K., Lavigne J.E., Mann J.J. Association Between Folic Acid Prescription Fills and Suicide Attempts and Intentional Self-harm Among Privately Insured US Adults. JAMA Psychiatry. 79(11), 1118-1123, 2022.

== Awards ==
- Youden Prize for Contributions to Inter-laboratory Calibration (ASA, 2006)
- University of Illinois at Chicago - Distinguished Faculty Award, 2009
- Professor Emeritus of Biostatistics, University of Illinois, 2010
- Pritzker Scholar, University of Chicago, 2011
- Endowed Chair University of Chicago – The Blum-Riese Professorship, 2016
- Distinguished Achievement Medal for the ASA's Section on Statistics and the Environment, 2016
