= Athletics at the 1950 British Empire Games – Men's javelin throw =

Men's javelin throw at the Commonwealth Games

The men's javelin throw event at the 1950 British Empire Games was held on 11 February at the Eden Park in Auckland, New Zealand.

== Results ==
Rank	Name	Nationality	Result	Notes
1st place, gold medalist(s)	Leo Roininen	Canada	187 ft 4 1/2 in (57.11 m)	
2nd place, silver medalist(s)	Luke Tunabuna	Fiji	183 ft 9 1/2 in (56.02 m)	
3rd place, bronze medalist(s)	Doug Robinson	Canada	182 ft 5 in (55.60 m)	
4	Antony Hignell	England	181 ft 7 in (55.35 m)	
5	Claude Clegg	New Zealand	175 ft 11 in (53.62 m)	
6	Stanley Lay	New Zealand	175 ft 4 in (53.44 m)	
7	Leslie McKeand	Australia	164 ft 11 1/2 in (50.28 m)	
	Svein Sigfusson	Canada	DNS	
