= Jeffrey Arnett =

American psychologist

Jeffrey Jensen Arnett is a professor in the Department of Psychology at Clark University in Massachusetts. His main research interest is in "emerging adulthood", a term he coined, which refers to the distinct phase between adolescence and young adulthood, occurring from the ages of 18 to 29.

== Career ==
Jeffrey Arnett completed a B.S. in psychology, at Michigan State University in 1980. Five years later, he finished an M.A. in developmental psychology at University of Virginia. In 1986 he finished his Ph.D., also at the University of Virginia, in developmental psychology. From 1986 to 1989, he was an assistant professor of psychology, at Oglethorpe University, Atlanta, Georgia. From 1989 to 1992, he was a research associate at the Rush-Presbyterian-St. Luke's Medical Center in Chicago. From 1989 to 1992, he was a postdoctoral fellow at the Northwestern University Department of Psychiatry and the Committee on Human Development at the University of Chicago. From 1992 to 1998 he was an associate professor at the University of Missouri. He was awarded tenure in 1996. From 1998 to 2005, he was a visiting associate professor at the University of Maryland, Department of Human Development and Department of Psychology.

Arnett authored a book on heavy metal subculture and teens, entitled Metalheads: Heavy Metal Music and Adolescent Alienation (1996, Westview Press). He also authored a textbook entitled Adolescence and Emerging Adulthood: A Cultural Approach (Prentice Hall). In May 2013, he coauthored a book (with Elizabeth Fishel), entitled Getting to 30: A Parent's Guide to the 20-Something Years. Arnett is a proponent of the idea that Generation Z is more "thoughtful and civic-minded" than previous generations.

== Emerging adulthood ==
Emerging adulthood is a phase of the life span between adolescence and full-fledged adulthood, proposed by Arnett in a 2000 article in the American Psychologist. Emerging adulthood also encompasses late adolescence and early adulthood. It primarily applies to young adults in developed countries who do not have children, do not live in their own home, or do not have sufficient income to become fully independent in their early to late 20s.

Arnett says emerging adulthood is the period between 18 and 25 years of age where adolescents become more independent and explore various life possibilities. Emerging adulthood is a new demographic, is contentiously changing, and some believe that twenty-somethings have always struggled with "identity exploration, instability, self-focus, and feeling in-between".

Jeffrey Arnett explains four movements that gave rise to this stage in life. The movements are: Youth movement, Technology revolution, Sexual revolution and women's movement. The factor that has revolutionized manufacturing and has been crucial is the technology revolution. It helped others be aware that education is essential, it has also spread rapidly to all the world.

Different psychologists and scientists have described different ways of explaining the transition to adulthood. Terms like "late adolescence" and "young adulthood" have been used before, however, Arnett explains that these terms don't work because "the lives of persons in their late teens and 20s are vastly different from the lives of most adolescents", and "young adulthood has been used already to refer to such diverse age periods." This creates a need for the term Emerging Adulthood.

In some cultures, it is more helpful for this period of life between 18 and 25 years of age to be described as emerging adulthood instead of being the "tail-end of a so called extended adolescence, or as the early part of a so-called young adulthood that stretches from 18 years to 40 or 45 years of age".

=== Why Does It Take so Long to Grow Up Today? ===
In a 2015 TED talk titled "Why Does It Take So Long To Grow Up Today?", Arnett detailed four revolutions that have led to an increase in the age of adulthood and have contributed to the emergence of his new stage of emerging adulthood. These are the technology and sexual revolutions, the Women's Movement, and the Youth Movement.

The technology revolution details moving away from a manufacturing economy and embracing a knowledge economy. Arnett argues that a significant share of the job market is dominated by the information and technology industry. Jobs in these fields are specialized and require more education. Arnett states that this increased emphasis on continuing education has led to a delay in completing other benchmarks of adulthood, such as marriage.

The sexual revolution is defined by the increase in the age of marriage, but in the decrease in the age of sexual experience. Arnett theorizes that the invention of birth control pills and more efficient contraceptives have resulted in a separation of sex and marriage. This means that young people spend much more time in sexual relationships that do not result in marriage. The goal of prolonging youth and holding onto the wild and fun era of life added to the decrease in age for sexual experiences.

The Women's Movement has led to an increase in the age that women begin seeking out a marital partner. This increase is a result of increased work and education opportunities for women. Arnett states that women are being considered for more employment positions in fields that have historically been open only to men. These increased opportunities have led to more women spending their 20s pursuing their education and their careers, and thus delaying marriage and childbearing.

The Youth Movement is an attitude of delaying getting older by trying to prolong youth. According to Arnett, youth are not in a rush to adulthood and are thus reaching milestones at older ages. As parenting styles have become less authoritarian and moved toward permissiveness, the pressure on an adolescent to move out and begin adulthood has minimized. Members of older generations have begun to encourage young people to "hold onto their youth", as well.

Some may perceive emerging adulthood as a period of selfish behavior due to its focus on self-exploration. For most emerging adults, this period of their lives is the first time they have been able to have full autonomy and personal freedom. This freedom can lead to reckless behavior as emerging adults explore their new-found independence. For example, many emerging adults participate in heavy drinking and drug use. While these behaviors may create lifelong destructive habits, most emerging adults report feeling "in control" and that they have the ability to redirect their lives.

=== Distinction from young adulthood and adolescence ===
Arnett suggests that there are a few reasons why the term young adulthood is not fit to describe the developmental period of the late teens and early twenties. First, the term "young adulthood" suggests that at this developmental stage, adulthood has already been reached. Arnett states that most people in this developmental stage believe they have not yet reached adulthood. Instead, they believe they are slowly progressing into adulthood, and thus the term "emerging adulthood" is much more appropriate.

What is more, if the years 18-25 are classified as "young adulthood," Arnett believes that it is then difficult to find an appropriate term for the thirties and that it is nonsensical to combine the late teenage years, twenties, and thirties together because the 18‑25 age period and the thirties are very distinct from one another. He says that while most 18- to 20-year-olds in the United States don't see themselves as adults and are still in the process of obtaining an education, are unmarried, and are childless, most people in their thirties in the United States see themselves as adults, have settled on a career, are married, and have at least one child.

Currently, it is appropriate to define adolescence as the period spanning ages 10 to 18. This is because people in this age group in the United States typically live at home with their parents, are undergoing pubertal changes, attend middle schools or junior high schools, and are involved in a "school-based peer culture". All of these characteristics are no longer normative after the age of 18, and it is therefore considered inappropriate to call the late teenage years and early twenties "adolescence" or "late adolescence". Furthermore, in the United States, the age of 18 is the age at which people are able to legally vote.

== Selected publications ==
- Arnett, Jeffrey Jensen. (2010). Adolescence and emerging adulthood: A cultural approach (4th ed.). Boston: Prentice Hall.
- Arnett, Jeffrey Jensen (2008). "The neglected 95%: Why American psychology needs to become less American". American Psychologist. 63 (7): 602–614. doi:10.1037/0003-066X.63.7.602. PMID 18855491.
- Arnett, Jeffrey Jensen (2008). "From 'worm food' to 'infinite bliss': Emerging adults' views of life after death. From theory to research". In Lerner, Richard M.; Roesner, Robert W.; Phelps, Erin (eds.). Positive Youth Development and Spirituality: From Theory to Research. Templeton Press. pp. 231–243. ISBN 978-1-59947-143-3.
- Arnett, Jeffrey Jensen. (Ed.) (2007). International encyclopedia of adolescence. New York: Routledge.
- Arnett, Jeffrey Jensen. (Ed.) (2007).Encyclopedia of children, adolescents, and the media. Thousand Oaks, CA: Sage.
- Arnett, Jeffrey Jensen. (2007). Adolescence and emerging adulthood: A cultural approach (3rd ed.). Upper Saddle River, NJ: Prentice Hall.
- Arnett, Jeffrey Jensen, & Tanner, J. L. (Eds.) (2006). Emerging adults in America: Coming of age in the 21st century. Washington, DC: American Psychogical Association.
- Arnett, Jeffrey Jensen (August 2006). "G. Stanley Hall's Adolescence: Brilliance and nonsense". History of Psychology. 9 (3): 186–197. doi:10.1037/1093-4510.9.3.186. PMID 17153143.
- Arnett, Jeffrey Jensen (2004). Emerging Adulthood: The Winding Road from the Late Teens Through the Twenties. New York: Oxford University Press. ISBN 978-0-19-803862-7.
- Arnett, Jeffrey Jensen (2002). "The psychology of globalization". American Psychologist. 57 (10): 774–783. doi:10.1037/0003-066X.57.10.774. PMID 12369500.
- Arnett, Jeffrey (1 December 1991). "Heavy metal music and reckless behavior among adolescents". Journal of Youth and Adolescence. 20 (6): 573–592. doi:10.1007/BF01537363. PMID 24263613. S2CID 5187290.
