= Kathleen Merikangas =

American psychologist

Kathleen Ries Merikangas
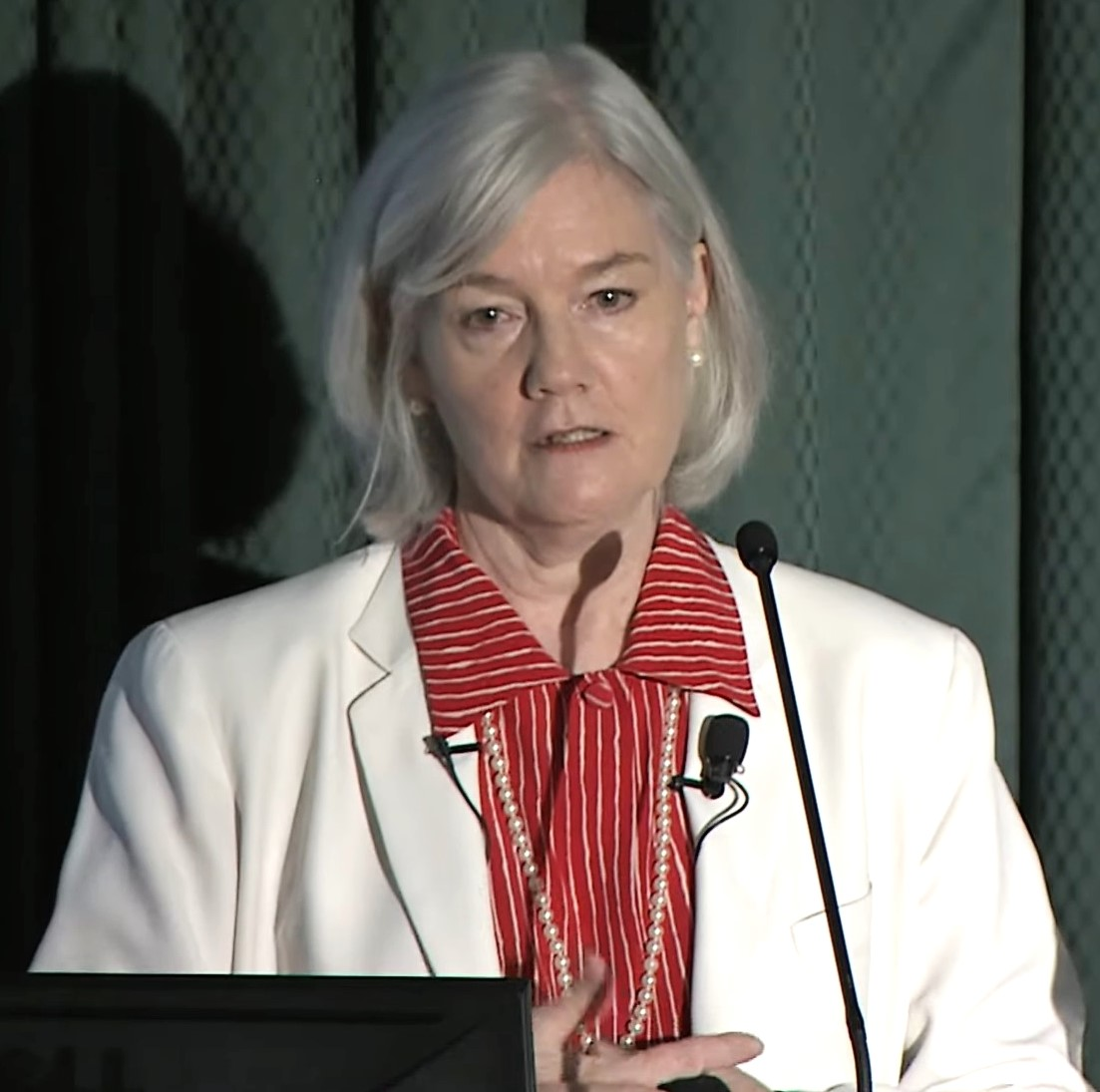
- Merikangas speaks at the National Human Genome Research Institute in 2014
- Born: Kathleen Ries
- Education: University of Notre Dame (BA); University of Pittsburgh Graduate School of Public Health (PhD)
- Awards: Rema Lapouse Award (2017); Paul Hoch Award (2015); NIMH IRP Outstanding Mentor Award (2015)
- Scientific career
- Fields: Genetic epidemiology Psychiatric epidemiology
- Workplaces: National Institute of Mental Health (NIMH); Yale School of Medicine

Kathleen Ries Merikangas is the Chief of the Genetic Epidemiology Research Branch in the Intramural Research Program at the National Institute of Mental Health (NIMH) and an adjunct professor of epidemiology at the Johns Hopkins Bloomberg School of Public Health. She has published more than 800 papers, and is best known for her work in adolescent mental disorders.

== Early life and education ==
Merikangas was born Kathleen Ries to F. William and Dorothy Campbell Ries. Merikangas earned her bachelor's degree summa cum laude in experimental psychology and music from University of Notre Dame in 1973.

She received her master's degree from University of Pittsburgh School of Medicine, which was sponsored by National Institute on Alcohol Abuse and Alcoholism. During this time, she did her clinical training and internship at the Western Psychiatric Institute and Clinic at the University of Pittsburgh School of Medicine.

She earned her Ph.D. in chronic disease epidemiology from University of Pittsburgh School of Public Health in 1981, focusing on conducting clinical research on the affective disorders. With the help of Career Development Award from National Institute of Mental Health, Merikangas did her postdoctoral work in population genetics and genetic epidemiology at Yale University School of Medicine.

== Career ==
Merikangas became a faculty member at Yale University School of Medicine, where she did her postdoctoral work. She worked as a Professor of Epidemiology and Public Health, Psychiatry and Psychology and the Director of the Genetic Epidemiology Research Unit in the Department of Epidemiology and Public Health. During her time at Yale, she proposed the genome-wide case-control associations of disorders, and conducted large population studies of mental disorders. The perspectives article titled "The Future of Genetic Studies of Complex Human Diseases" that appeared in journal Science in 1996, which she co-authored with Neil Risch, has been cited more than 3,000 times. She left Yale in 2003.

After joining NIMH after leaving Yale, Merikangas conducted large scale survey-based studies including the first nationally representative study of adolescent mental disorders. Her 2011 study on shyness and social phobia of American teenagers attracted huge media attention. Other areas of focus include eating disorders, bipolar disorder, suicidal behaviors, and substance abuse in adolescents.

== Awards and honors ==
- 2017: Rema Lapouse Award for Achievement in Epidemiology, Mental Health and Applied Public Health Statistics
- 2015: Paul Hoch Award for Career Contribution to Research in Psychopathology Association
- 2015: NIMH IRP Outstanding Mentor Award

== See also ==
- National Comorbidity Survey
