= Otto Dohrenwend =

American investment banker (1899–1989)

- Born: Otto E. Dohrenwend; 1899
- Died: 1989 (aged 89–90)
- Education: Columbia College
- Occupation: Investment banker
- Known for: Conservative political activism during the 1950s
- Spouse: Constance Wilckes

Otto E. Dohrenwend (1899–1989) was an American investment banker from Scarsdale, New York, best known for his conservative political activism during the 1950s.

As chairman of the Scarsdale Citizens Committee, better known as the Committee of Ten, during the 1950s and 1960s, he challenged what he called Communist influence in the Scarsdale public schools. An investigation by the Scarsdale Town Club later rejected these claims. He later drew national attention when challenging the rights of supporters of the Freedom Riders to hold a fund-raising benefit in a public high school auditorium.

Dohrenwend was a senior partner in the brokerage firm of Baker, Weeks & Harden from 1936 to 1972. He also served as a member of the national American Legion's Americanism Committee and on the board of trustees of Manhattanville College in Purchase, New York.

He was married to the former Constance Wilckes. Dohrenwend graduated from Columbia College in 1917. He became a Knight of Malta in 1950.
