= Suzanne Ildstad =

American physician and medical researcher

Suzanne Tollerud Ildstad
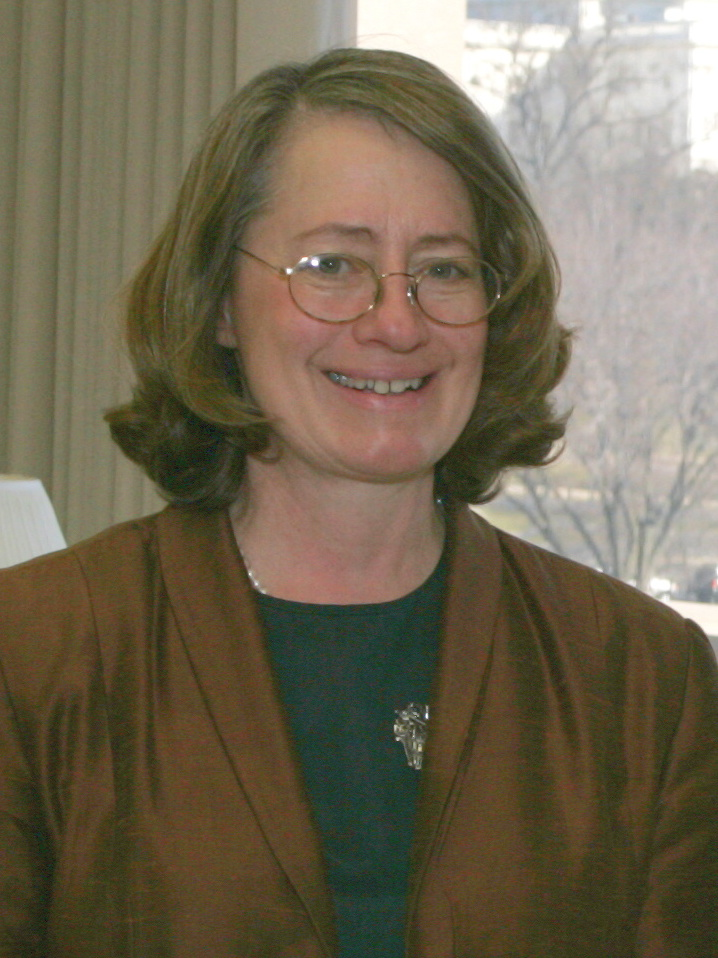
- Born: Suzanne Ildstad; May 20, 1952 (age 74); Hennepin County, Minnesota, US
- Education: Mayo Clinic Medical School
- Occupations: Physician, medical researcher
- Known for: Founding CEO of Talaris Therapeutics

Suzanne Tollerud Ildstad (born May 20, 1952, in Hennepin County, Minnesota) is an American physician and medical researcher. She is the Chief Scientific Officer and founding CEO of Talaris Therapeutics (her discovery of tolerogenic graft facilitating cells led to the formation of the company). She also serves the board of directors. She is also the Jewish Hospital Distinguished Professor of Transplantation Research, Director of the Institute for Cellular Therapeutics, Professor in the Department of Surgery with associate appointments in the Departments of Physiology & Biophysics and Microbiology & Immunology at the University of Louisville School of Medicine.

== Life ==
After earning her medical degree at Mayo Clinic Medical School, Ildstad did her surgical residency at Massachusetts General Hospital, an immunology fellowship at the National Institutes of Health, and a pediatric surgery/transplant fellowship at Cincinnati Children's Hospital.

Ildstad was elected to the National Academy of Medicine in 1997 and in 2014 was made a fellow of the National Academy of Inventors.

Ildstad is a named inventor or co-inventor on more than 100 patents.

She changed her middle name to "Tollerud" upon her marriage to David J. Tollerud, M.D. They have a son and a daughter.
