= Olle Hagnell =

Swedish psychiatrist and epidemiologist (1924–2011)

- Born: 29 July 1924; Halmstad, Sweden
- Died: 4 January 2011 (aged 86); Lund, Sweden
- Citizenship: Swedish
- Education: Lund University
- Scientific career
- Fields: Psychiatry, epidemiology
- Workplaces: Lund University; Cornell University; Columbia University

Eric Olof "Olle" Hagnell (July 29, 1924 - April 1, 2011) was a Swedish psychiatrist and epidemiologist.

Hagnell was born in Halmstad, Sweden on July 29, 1924 to Eric Hagnell, an editor-in-chief, and Ruth Hagnell. During his doctoral studies, he worked as an assistant physician in Lund and as a research assistant at the Department of Anthropology and Sociology at Cornell University in New York. In 1966, he received a doctoral degree in psychiatry from Lund University. After completing his doctoral program, Hagnell became a docent and worked as a visiting professor at Columbia University in New York. In 1974, he was promoted to professor in forensic psychiatry and social psychiatry at Lund University.

During his career at Lund University, Hagnell was recognized as a leader in research into psychiatric epidemiology, the study of the root causes of mental disorders in a population-wide sense. During his research career, he worked as a research director for the Lundby Study, a longitudinal survey of the mental health in a total Swedish population between 1947 and 1997. International reviewers have stated that "the Lundby Study has produced prevalence, incidence and outcome data on depression and anxiety over many years, and is one of the few studies capable of producing reliable data on changes in incidence". Olle Hagnell was awarded the Rema Lapouse Award in 1978 for his scientific work with the Lundby Study and his contributions in the area of psychiatric epidemiology.

Olle Hagnell was married to Gertrud Hagnell and they adopted a daughter from South Korea. He is cousin to governor Hans Hagnell.
