= Alastair Hignell =

England international rugby union player & cricketer

Alastair James Hignell CBE
- Born: 4 September 1955 (age 71) Ely, Cambridgeshire, England
- University: Cambridge University
- Notable relative: AF Hignell (father)
- Occupation(s): Schoolmaster and Professional Cricketer

Rugby union career
- Position: Fullback
Amateur team(s)
Years	Team	Apps	(Points)
- Bristol
International career
Years	Team	Apps	(Points)
1975 – 1979	England	14	(48)

Official website
- http://www.alastairhignell.com

Alastair Hignell
Personal information
- Full name: Alastair James Hignell
- Born: 4 September 1955 (age 71); Ely, Cambridgeshire
- Batting: Right-handed
- Bowling: Right-arm leg-break
- Role: Batsman
- Relatives: Antony Hignell (father)

Domestic team information
- Years: Team
- 1974–1983: Gloucestershire
- 1975–1978: Cambridge University
- FC debut: 24 July 1974 Gloucestershire v Surrey
- Last FC: 30 August 1983 Gloucestershire v Nottinghamshire
- LA debut: 11 August 1974 Gloucestershire v Northants
- Last LA: 28 August 1983 Gloucestershire v Lancashire

Career statistics
Competition	First-class	List A
Matches	170	138
Runs scored	7,459	2,454
Batting average	29.48	23.37
100s/50s	11/41	0/9
Top score	149*	85*
Balls bowled	341	3
Wickets	3	0
Bowling average	76.66	–
5 wickets in innings	0	–
10 wickets in match	0	–
Best bowling	2/13	–
Catches/stumpings	150/–	56/–
- Source: CricketArchive, 16 December 2008

Alastair James Hignell CBE (born 4 September 1955) is an English former rugby union international, first–class cricketer, and broadcaster.

== Education ==
Hignell was born at Ely, Cambridgeshire and educated at Denstone College, an independent boarding school for boys, in the village of Denstone in Staffordshire in Central England before going up to Fitzwilliam College, Cambridge. Hignell won Blues at Cambridge in both cricket and rugby union, and when he graduated in 1977 he had already made several England appearances at full back. He was the second man to captain Cambridge at both cricket and rugby union.

== Sporting career ==
Hignell made his England rugby union debut in 1975 in a brutal encounter with Australia in Brisbane – eight days later he was playing for Gloucestershire against Middlesex at Bristol and five weeks later he made 60 in the Varsity match.

After leaving university, he continued playing rugby for Bristol and England in the winter, while also working as a teacher (including at Bristol Cathedral School and Sherborne School), and cricket for Gloucestershire in the summer. As a right-handed batsman, he scored solidly rather than spectacularly, passing 1,000 runs in a season three times, including his final season in 1983, before his retirement. He won the last of his 14 England rugby caps in 1978–79.

== Journalism ==
Hignell continued to teach until he moved into journalism full-time and he became a respected reporter, as well as working extensively on BBC Radio. In 1999, he was diagnosed with multiple sclerosis and has since been an active fundraiser.

His final commentary for BBC Radio 5 Live was the 2007–08 Guinness Premiership Final at Twickenham, where Wasps beat Leicester Tigers 26–16. Retiring Wasps captain Lawrence Dallaglio dedicated the victory to Hignell. Later in 2008 he provided weekly rugby podcasts on the This is Bristol website.

== Charity work ==
Alastair Hignell became Patron of Multiple Sclerosis UK (MS-UK) (formally Multiple Sclerosis Resource Centre) in 2002 and has since been active in raising funds for the charity.

In 2008, inspired by Alastair's heroic achievements on and off the pitch, Higgy's Heroes, a fundraising body linked to MS-UK was created. Initially a one-off idea by a group of ex-teammates and opponents who decided to run the London Marathon in tribute to Hignell, the name and the idea continued beyond this one event. Since then there have been a number of Higgy's Heroes fundraising events largely based on physical achievements or sports activities. These include participants at the London Marathon and a regular large turn out in Alastair's home town for the yearly Stroud Half Marathon. Alastair moved to Brighton after living in Stroud for four years.

== Honours ==
Hignell won the BBC Sports Personality of the Year Helen Rollason Award in 2008 for his work in spreading awareness of multiple sclerosis.

Hignell was appointed Commander of the Order of the British Empire (CBE) in the 2009 Birthday Honours.

He won the 'Best Rugby Book' category in the 2012 British Sports Book Awards for the book Higgy.
