= Barbara Snell Dohrenwend =

Epidemiologist and social psychologist

Barbara Snell Dohrenwend (March 26, 1927 – June 28, 1982) was an American epidemiologist and social psychologist. She was born in New York City to Foster D. Snell and Cornelia Tyler Snell. She received a B.A. from Wellesley College in 1947 and a Ph.D. in psychology from Columbia University in 1954.

Dohrenwend continued her work as a researcher with positions at the University of Michigan, Cornell University and New York University. In 1961, Dohrenwend joined the faculty at the City College of City University of New York as a lecturer in psychology; in 1972, she was promoted to a full professor where she taught for seven years. Barbara Dohrenwend's final position was at Columbia University School of Public Health, where she was a professor and the head of the Division of Sociomedical Sciences from 1979 until her death from cancer in 1982.

Dohrenwend is credited as one of the major women who contributed to the emergence of community psychology and was the first woman to be elected president of the American Psychological Association's (APA) Division of Community Psychology, Division 27. In 1981, she and her husband received the Rema Lapouse Award for Distinguished Contribution to Community Psychology and Community Health from the APA.

Dohrenwend's major work focused on stressors in life and their influence on the development and emergence of psychiatric illness. She and her husband, Bruce P. Dohrenwend, worked closely together on this topic, and authored or edited four books, among them, Stressful Life Events: Their Nature and Effects (1974) and Stressful Life Events and Their Contexts (1981).

Dohrenwend's personal philosophy was that research should be conducted with the intention of reducing psychological suffering. Her research practice was praised for its rigor and sophistication in methodology.

Her final work before her death was concerned with schizophrenia and major depressive disorder. The work was ultimately published in the American Journal of Community Psychology in 1987 by her collaborators in New York City and Israel titled "Life Stress and Pathology: Progress on Research Begun with Barbara Snell Dohrenwend".

Dohrenwend's other notable publications include; "Symptoms, Hassles, Social Supports, and Life Events: Problem of Confounded Measures", published in the Journal of Abnormal Psychology (1984); "Social Status and Stressful Life Events", in the Journal of Personality and Social Psychology (1973); "Social and Cultural Influences on Psychopathology", in the Annual Review of Psychology (1974). She published numerous articles in Issues in Mental Health Nursing, American Journal of Community Psychology, and the Journal of Health and Social Behavior as well.

In November 2025, the Columbia University Mailman School of Public Health announced the inauguration of the Barbara and Bruce P. Dohrenwend Professorship in Sociomedical Sciences to honor the legacy of Barbara Dohrenwend and her husband Bruce P. Dohrenwend. The first recipient of this endowed professorship was Kathleen J. Sikkama, Ph.D., a clinical psychologist at Mailman School of Public Health who specializes in community-based interventions for mental health and HIV prevention.
