= Antony Hignell =

English cricketer and javelin thrower

Personal information
- Nationality: British (English)
- Born: 6 July 1928 Kroonstad, South Africa
- Died: 23 October 2015 (aged 87)

Sport
- Sport: Athletics/Cricket
- Event: javelin
- Club: Achilles Club

Antony Francis Hignell (6 July 1928 – 23 October 2015) was an English cricketer and javelin thrower.

== Cricket career ==
He was a right-handed batsman and right-arm medium-pace bowler who played for Gloucestershire. He was born in Kroonstad.

Hignell made a single first-class appearance for the team, during the 1947 season, against Cambridge University. He scored 7 runs in the only innings in which he batted, and conceded 48 runs with the ball in 18 overs.

Hignell played for Gloucestershire Second XI in the Minor Counties Championship during the 1948 season.

== Athletics career ==
Hignell became the British javelin throw champion after winning the British AAA Championships title at the 1949 AAA Championships.

Hignell represented the England athletics team at the 1950 British Empire Games in Auckland, New Zealand, where he placed fourth at the men's javelin throw event.

== Personal life ==
He was the father of Alastair Hignell, who played cricket for Cambridge University and Gloucestershire and rugby union for England, Cambridge University and Bristol.

Hignell died on 23 October 2015 at the age of 87.
