= Hans Hagnell =

Swedish politician and economist

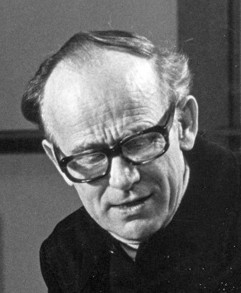
Hans Hagnell

Hans Hagnell (December 15, 1919 – June 16, 2006) was a Swedish Social Democratic politician, governor and economist.

Hagnell was born in Gothenburg, Sweden on December 15, 1919, to Axel Hagnell, an author and illustrator, and Maria Hagnell. He is cousin to professor Olle Hagnell. Hagnell studied at University of Gothenburg, and graduated with a master's degree in political science in 1946 and a licentiate degree in economics in 1948.

In 1956 Hagnell was elected as a Social Democratic member of the Second Chamber of the Swedish Parliament, representing Stockholm, and he became a member of various committees. He served as member of the Swedish parliament from 1956 to 1973. In 1971 Hagnell was appointed to governor of Gävleborg County (1971–1986) by prime minister Olof Palme. Hagnell succeeded Jarl Hjalmarson, the former leader of the conservative Swedish Moderate Party as governor.
