= Juvenile law =

Law for those below the age of majority

Juvenile law pertains to those who are deemed to be below the age of majority, which varies by country and culture. Usually, minors are treated differently under the law. However, even minors may be prosecuted as adults.

== Juvenile law by country ==
In both France and the United States, some actions are prohibited for minors, such as the underage consumption of alcohol or tobacco, truancy, running away from home, and ungovernability. A minor can thus become a status offender.

=== United States ===
In the United States, the juvenile varies in definition from state to state. The system applies to anyone between the ages of 6 and 10, depending on the state, and 18; except for 11 states (including Georgia, Illinois, Louisiana, Massachusetts, Michigan, Missouri, South Carolina, and Texas), where a juvenile is a person under 17 and New York and North Carolina, where it is under 15. Thus, criminal majority begins at 16, 17, or 18.

The federal Juvenile Justice and Delinquency Act of 1974 set up four key requirements for US minors:

- Firstly, the deinstitutionalization of status offenders, moving them from juvenile halls to community-based or family-based environments.
- Secondly, segregation (sight and sound separation) between juvenile and adult offenders
- Thirdly, strong limitation for the juvenile justice system to put juveniles in adult jails.
- Fourthly, the protection of minority groups from being overrepresented in high security.

All states participate except South Dakota and Wyoming.

=== France ===
France has three stages of minors:

- The infant, still without a perception of acts yet, commits no offense and so cannot be convicted.
- A minor between 7/8 and 13 has his discernment. No criminal punishment but only educative measures can be pronounced against him, according to a 2002 law.
- A minor between 13 and 18 who commits an offense can have a punishment that is educational or, in special cases, criminal.

The criminal irresponsibility of children under 13 is defined by Article 122-8 of the Criminal Code. Those between 13 and 18 are assumed to be irresponsible, but they can be involved in a criminal sentence if the circumstances and the juvenile's delinquent personality justify it.

== Operation ==
According to Jean Pierre Rosenczveig, a children's judge in Bobigny, near Paris, the juvenile criminal law in France has six key requirements:

1. The specialization of the magistrate. Indeed, the juvenile criminal system has its intervener: the children's judge, the court of assizes of minors, the court of appeal chamber of minors, etc.
2. Criminal relative responsibility begins at the age of 13.
3. The priority is to educate, rather than punish. Article 2 of the order of February 2, 1945, imposes an educative-placing proposal to minors to whom a detention-placing measure is considered.
4. Parents have to be informed of their child's police custody. Moreover, Article 13 of the same order imposes an examination of the parents before the decision of the tribunal. Also, before the juvenile's police custody, the service for the legal protection of youth must be called.
5. Requirement of an attorney for the juvenile. If he does not contact one, the jurisdiction has to do it for him.

In the US, the presence of an attorney is only recommended, not compulsory.

In most states, special courts try juveniles, but some like Colorado do not have them. Some crimes allow juvenile delinquents to be tried by the superior court (such as first-degree murder or gang murder).

Juveniles also have special protections, in addition to juvenile courts, which are closed to the public in the US. In France, closing the court to the public (huis clos) is an option. Just like in France, US parents or guardians have to be informed and to be present during the police questioning. At least, the names of juveniles are kept confidential when they are accused of a crime. Juvenile cases are heard by not a jury by a judge.

At least, the US criminal law system has a particular vocabulary for juvenile cases. Indeed, juvenile offenders commit not a crime but a delinquent act. Also, courts use the term delinquent or not delinquent, instead of guilty or not guilty, just to show that a minor is different from a criminal.

Juveniles have the same rights as adults. They are assumed innocent, they are notified of charges in advance of any adjudication of delinquency, they have the right to confront and cross-examine witnesses, and they have the Fifth Amendment right against self-incrimination.

After their arrest, in both countries, minors may be placed in provisory detention (until a European Convention on Human Rights case banned it in France) if the parents are prejudiced and informed. Provisory detention is done in a juvenile hall, separated from adults.

US parents may be liable for the acts of their child if they fail their parent's authority, an example being if the minor is involved in a gang offense. Also, juveniles have no right to bail.

As can be noted, UD and French procedures are not that different as they have a common goal: to protect, as much as possible, the interest of the minor offender. Nevertheless, except for detention (the separation from adults as well as parents' awareness), the priorities are different. The US prefers the confidentiality of minors, but France stresses accommodating the juvenile within the criminal system.

Both systems protect but not in the same way. In France, an attorney is compulsory. In the US, there is no jury.

As noted, the goal of juvenile justice in France and the US is clearly to educate child offenders, rather than punish them, even if some measures can be severe.

== Sanctions incurred by minors ==
The order of February 2, 1945, relative to childhood delinquency contains three measures to punish French minor offenders:

- Firstly, the educational measure can be an admonition, a particular educational placing, under legal protection (up to five years), or supervised freedom.
- Secondly, the mediation-retrieval measure in which the minor is involved in the reparation of the damage he caused. The victim must approve. A minor between 16 and 18 may be submitted to a general interest working.
- Thirdly, the imprisonment measure may not exceed half of the adult imprisonment term. However, the oldest minors (over 16) may have the same penalty as adults if the offence is serious.

The punishment depends on the minor's age. As aforesaid, if they are under 7 or 8, they will not be punished. If they are between 8 and 13, the sentence is nothing more than an educational punishment. If they are over 13, they can have both an educational and a criminal punishment, but the tribunal has to explain its decision according to the minor's personality and the circumstances.

The US is less divided. The penalty is equal for every juvenile offender over 10, and there is no stage differentiation between measures. However, the measures themselves are quite the same:

- Placing the delinquent in the care of an institution to take care of him
- Placing the delinquent in an alternative incarceration program
- Ordering the delinquent to participate in a treatment program
- Ordering the child to work in public buildings or private property
- Ordering the child to take part in the reparation for the damage they caused
- Committing the delinquent to the Department of Children and Families if his family is not adequate.

Since 1988, the death penalty for children who committed crimes has been outlawed. Also, in March 2005, the death penalty was outlawed for killers who committed their crimes before the age of 18. There were 72 people on death row concerned at the time.

== See also ==
- Juvenile delinquency
- Juvenile court
- Rubik's Cube
- Tetris

== Sources ==
- Sénat in French
- Jurispedia, Minorité pénale in French
- Rosenczveig, Jean Pierre; Droit pénal des mineurs, étude de
- US Info
- An introduction to comparative criminal justice
- American juvenile justice system
- Juvenile delinquency
- The federal Juvenile Justice and Delinquency Act
- Juvenile Sanctions, Info Online
- ABA Net
