= College on Problems of Drug Dependence =

Professional society in the United States

The College on Problems of Drug Dependence (CPDD) is a professional society in the United States addressing problems in addiction and substance use.

== History ==
CPDD was originally established in 1929 by the Bureau of Social Hygiene as a 'Committee on Drug Addiction'. From 1929-1976, CPDD was associated with the National Academy of Sciences, National Research Council. In 1976, the organization was reincorporated as an independent body affiliated with other scientific and professional societies.

== Activities ==
CPDD sponsors an 'Advocacy day', where members travel to Washington, DC and meet with US House of Representatives and Congressional staff to talk about research into Substance Use Disorder, evidence-based policies, and to encourage continued funding of the National Institute on Drug Abuse.

CPDD sponsors the peer-reviewed scientific journal Drug & Alcohol Dependence, which publishes original research articles, reviews, and commentaries in the area of drug, alcohol, and tobacco use.

== Annual meeting ==
The first annual meeting of CPDD as an independent "Committee on Problems of Drug Dependence, Inc.", was held at the International Inn in Washington, D.C., in February 1977. The meetings act as a forum to bring together basic and clinical scientists from across industry, academia, and government.
