= Bruce Dohrenwend =

American psychiatric epidemiologist (1927–2025)

Bruce P. Dohrenwend
- Born: Bruce Philip Dohrenwend; July 26, 1927
- Died: February 4, 2025 (aged 97)
- Citizenship: American
- Education: Columbia University B.A. 1950, M.A. 1951 Cornell University Ph.D., 1955
- Known for: Post-traumatic stress disorder
- Spouse: Barbara Dohrenwend (until 1982) Catherine Douglass
- Scientific career
- Fields: Psychiatric epidemiology
- Workplaces: Columbia University, Mailman School of Public Health, New York State Psychiatric Institute

Bruce Philip Dohrenwend (July 26, 1927 – February 4, 2025) was an American social psychologist and psychiatric epidemiologist who documented the effects of stress and adversity on the development and course of psychopathology. He spent his entire career at the Department of Psychiatry at Columbia University and the affiliated New York State Psychiatric Institute.

== Education ==
Dohrenwend graduated from Columbia College (New York) in 1950, and the next year earned an M.A. in social psychology at Columbia University. In 1955 he received his Ph.D. from Cornell University in social psychology. Before starting college he served in the United States Navy (1945-1946).

== Career ==
In 1955 Dohrenwend worked under Alexander H. Leighton on the Stirling County Study, which was a community-based study of mental health in a Canadian fishing community. In 1958 he joined the Columbia University faculty and began his research on the Washington Heights Community Health Project. He remained on the active faculty until 2020, when he retired. Before retiring he was the Foundations Fund for Research in Psychiatry Professor, an endowed chair. Dohrenwend also had an appointment as Research Scientist, and later Chief of the Division of Social Psychiatry at the New York State Psychiatric Institute, which is located at the Columbia Medical School campus.

In the early 1960s he and Barbara Snell Dohrenwend, a social and community psychologist who was also his wife, collaborated on a research program that focused on measuring psychopathology and stressful life events in community settings. Their collaboration led to the publication of dozens of articles, two coauthored monographs and two edited books. For their work they were jointly presented the Award for Distinguished Contributions to Community Psychology and Community Mental Health from division 27 of the American Psychological Association (1980), and the Rema Lapouse Mental Health Epidemiology Award from the American Public Health Association (1981). Dr. Barbara Dohrenwend died in 1982.

Following the Three-Mile Island nuclear reactor meltdown in March 1979, Bruce Dohrenwend was asked to chair a federal task force focused on the effects of stress experienced by workers and residents in the vicinity of the reactor. The group documented that mental stress caused by miscommunication of government and regulatory agencies was a serious consequence of the accident, despite the actual containment of radiation

Dohrenwend continued in the 1980s to advance his program of research that focused on causal mechanisms that explained the onset of psychopathology. He used a quasi-experimental design to show in 1991 that some disorders were more likely to be caused by stress processes, whereas other disorders were more likely to be caused by selection processes consistent with genetic factors. His report of this finding, published in Science, received the American Association for Advancement of Science (AAAS) 1990 Prize for Behavioral Science Research.

Dohrenwend also developed a model of the genesis of post-traumatic stress disorder (PTSD) among persons engaged in combat or who were in the vicinity of combat. Dohrenwend was specifically concerned with persons who had no predisposition for psychopathology but who were exposed to combat-related events that were markedly different from usual human experience.

In addition to his many scientific contributions, Dohrenwend was an active educator and mentor. In 1972 he established the Columbia University Psychiatric Epidemiology Training Program, which funded and trained scores of graduate students and postdoctoral fellows from a variety of disciplines. This training program emphasizes "a framework for investigating the etiology, course, and consequences of mental illness that highlights the dynamic interplay of multiple levels, that is, a person (biology, psychology), in context (family, social network, neighborhood, workplace, society) through time (person and contextual change)."

== Recognition and awards ==
In addition to the joint awards with Barbara Snell Dohrenwend, Bruce Dohrenwend was asked to serve as president of the American Psychopathological Association in 1994, and he received the following awards from professional organizations: Hamilton Award (1994) and Zubin Award (2008) from the American Psychopathological Association; Award for Distinguished Contributions to Psychiatric Sociology, Society for the Study of Social Problems (1994); Leo G. Reeder Award for a Distinguished Career from the Medical Sociology Section of the American Sociological Association (1999); Harvard Award for Outstanding Contributions and Lifetime Commitment to Psychiatric Epidemiology, Harvard School of Public Health (2004); In 2007 the Mental Health Section of the American Sociological Association gave Dohrenwend and his coauthors the award for best 2006 publication for the article titled “The Psychological Risks of Vietnam for U.S. Veterans: A Revisit with New Data and Methods,” Science, 2006, 313, 979-982.

== Death and Legacy ==
Dohrenwend died on February 4, 2025, at the age of 97.

In November 2025, the Columbia University Mailman School of Public Health announced the inauguration of the Barbara and Bruce P. Dohrenwend Professorship in Sociomedical Sciences and the Bruce P. Dohrenwend Assistant Professorship of Psychiatric Epidemiology to honor the legacy of Bruce P. Dohrenwend and his wife Barbara Dohrenwend. The first recipient of the endowed professorship in sociomedical sciences was Kathleen J. Sikkama, Ph.D., a clinical psychologist at Mailman School of Public Health who specializes in community-based interventions for mental health and HIV prevention. The first recipient of the assistant professorship in psychiatric epidemiology was John R. Pamplin II, Ph.D., MPH, a social epidemiologist who studies the impact of structural racism and systematic inequality on mental health and substance use .

== Notable Publications ==
- Dohrenwend, Bruce P.; Dohrenwend, Barbara S. (1969). Social Status and Psychological Disorder: A Causal Inquiry. New York: Wiley.
- Dohrenwend, Bruce P.; Dohrenwend, Barbara Snell; Gould, Madelyn Schwartz; Link, Bruce; Neugebauer, Richard; Wunsch-Hitzig, Robin (1980). Mental Illness in the United States: Epidemiologic Estimates. New York: Praeger.
- Dohrenwend, Bruce P. (1998). Adversity, Stress and Psychopathology. New York: Oxford.
- Dohrenwend, Bruce P.; Turse, Nick; Yager, Thomas J.; Wall, Melanie M. (2019). Surviving Vietnam: The Psychological Consequences of the War for U.S. Veterans. New York: Oxford.
- Dohrenwend, Bruce P. (1983). "Psychological Implications of Nuclear Accidents: The Case of Three Mile Island". Bulletin of the New York Academy of Medicine. 59 (10): 1060–1076.
- Dohrenwend, Bruce P.; Shrout, Patrick E.; Egri, Gladys; Mendelsohn, Frederick S. (1980). "Nonspecific psychological distress and other dimensions of psychopathology: Measures for use in the general population". Archives of General Psychiatry. 37 (11): 1129–1236.
- Dohrenwend, Bruce P.; Levav, Itzhak; Shrout, Patrick E.; Schwartz, Sharon; Naveh, Guedalia; Link, Bruce G.; Skodol, Andrew E.; Stueve, Ann (1992). "Socioeconomic status and psychiatric disorders: the causation-selection issue". Science. 255 (5047): 946–952.
- Dohrenwend, Bruce P.; Turner, J. Blake; Turse, Nicholas A.; Adams, Ben G.; Koenen, Karestan C.; Marshall, Randall (2006). "The psychological risks of Vietnam for US veterans: a revisit with new data and methods". Science. 313 (5789): 979–982.
- Dohrenwend, Bruce P.; Yager, Thomas J.; Wall, Melanie M.; Adams, Ben G. (2013). "The roles of combat exposure, personal vulnerability, and involvement in harm to civilians or prisoners in Vietnam war-related posttraumatic stress disorder". Clinical Psychological Science. 1 (3): 223–238.
