= Brain matures at 25 myth =

Scientific misconception

The "brain matures at 25" myth or "twenty-five year old brain" myth is the belief that the human brain reaches an adult level of maturity at exactly or around age 25. This interpretation is widespread in the media and public discourse and appears in some scientific literature. It has multiple variants. The most common relates to the prefrontal cortex and its role in functions such as decision-making, long-term planning, risk assessment, and impulse control. The prefrontal cortex has been shown to mature at a slower rate than other parts of the brain. This finding has been widely cited in popular media, public discourse, and some policy contexts to argue that people under 25 lack mature decision-making capabilities. It originated from the research of neuroscientist Jay Giedd, who, when speaking to Time magazine, speculatively expressed a desire to have continued his studies on brain development, which ended at age 18 to 20 and found the brain still developing at those points, all the way to age 25.

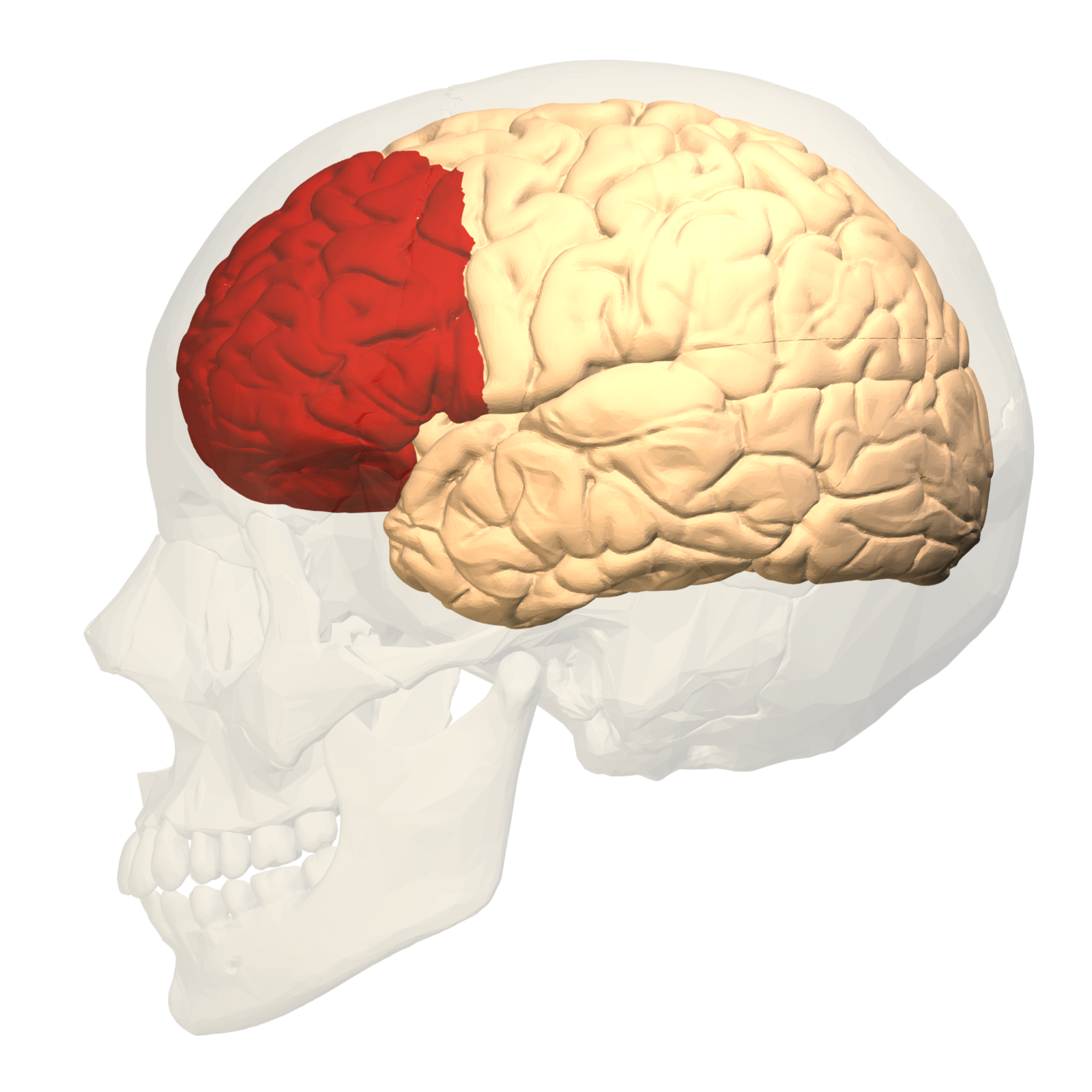
A model of the prefrontal cortex

Brain development refers to a variety of processes, including neurogenesis, synaptogenesis, synaptic pruning, and behavioral changes. Most research indicates that major human brain development continues into the twenties, but there is no strong evidence suggesting a sharp cutoff at 25 or that people younger than that are less capable of making decisions. Neuroplasticity, or the broader capacity for the brain to develop (adapt, form new synapses, etc.), continues throughout life, allowing the lifelong creation and maintenance of memories and procedural skills.

== Origin and spread ==
=== Jay Giedd ===
Jay N. Giedd, a child and adolescent psychiatrist and researcher at the National Institute of Mental Health (NIMH), led some of the earliest and most influential longitudinal MRI studies on human brain development during childhood and adolescence. A foundational study in this field was published in 1999 in Nature Neuroscience, analyzing 243 MRI scans from 145 healthy participants (consisting of 89 males and 46 females). It demonstrated that cortical gray matter in frontal regions peaks in pre-adolescence and then thins through synaptic pruning, with the prefrontal cortex among the last areas to mature.

This research was part of an ongoing longitudinal project at NIMH that ran from approximately 1994 to 2004. A more densely sampled subset of 13 participants from this same project, each receiving repeated scans roughly every two years, was published in a 2004 article that was later featured in Time. In the article, he speculated that an age of "maturity" would be around 25 years old. He is quoted as saying, "When we started, we thought we'd follow kids until about 18 or 20. If we had to pick a number now, we'd probably go to age 25."

In June 2005, Giedd co-authored a longer report titled "The Adolescent Brain: A Work in Progress" with Daniel R. Weinberger and Brita Elvevåg. The document was commissioned and published by the National Campaign to Prevent Teen Pregnancy.

=== Laurence Steinberg ===
Laurence Steinberg is another influential figure in adolescent brain psychology. His research has often been invoked in discussions of the juvenile justice system and has been cited in landmark U.S. supreme court decisions, including Roper v. Simmons, Graham v. Florida, and Miller v. Alabama (2012), which limited criminal sentencing of juveniles on the grounds of developmental immaturity. He has proposed that the science of neuroplasticity should redefine how society treats "adolescents".

In the Time article "What Makes Teens Tick", he would state, "The parts for exercising judgment are still maturing throughout the course of adolescence. So you've got this time gap between when things impel kids toward taking risks early in adolescence, and when things that allow people to think before they act come online. It's like turning on the engine of a car without a skilled driver at the wheel." He would later say in a 2022 article that he was not sure where the "25" number came from in regards to the age of brain maturity, stating, "I honestly don't know why people picked 25. It's a nice-sounding number? It's divisible by five?"

Steinberg’s research has continued to be invoked in the 2020s in state and federal cases seeking to extend juvenile sentencing protections to "emerging adults".

=== Historical background ===
There is precedent for claiming the twenties to be part of "adolescence". Around 1900, psychologist G. Stanley Hall considered adolescence to consist roughly of ages 12–21 for females and 14–25 for males. He tied it to being a stage of "storm and stress"; he noted higher crime rates, sensation seeking, susceptibility to media, and sensitivity to peer relationships, but later psychologists consider other major points outdated, such as his views on Lamarckian evolution, sexual development, and religious conversion.

== Analysis ==
=== Prefrontal cortex development ===
The development of the brain is a lifelong process. Maturity is assessed via structural MRI (gray/white matter volume, cortical thickness), functional MRI (activation patterns), and diffusion tensor imaging (myelination/connectivity). These processes do not peak or end at 25 and no executive function changes are found around this age.

=== Development of cognitive functions ===
Empirical data on youth risk varies, but individual differences matter more than chronological age. Equating structural changes with behavioral "immaturity" risks oversimplification; adolescents often have adult-like performance on many tasks. A major study (2025) identifies distinct developmental epochs in brain network organization across the lifespan, showing that maturation unfolds in phases with a prolonged and dynamic period extending into the early 30s rather than ending in the mid-20s. They found an epoch of 9–32 years of age. A study from 2023 found that brain signal latencies decrease across the lifespan by 0.73 ms until the age of 10, while decreasing by 0.43 ms between the ages of 20 and 30, with latency decreases ending at around 35 years of age or older.

It is not supported that marijuana use impairs cognitive function of those 18–25 more than it does those older than 25.

== Policy impacts ==
The "brain matures at 25" myth has been widely adopted in legal and policy circles to justify treating those 25-years and under as neurologically immature and less culpable for their actions. It has been cited in criminal sentencing reforms in Scotland, where courts are encouraged to consider reduced culpability for those under 25. In the United States, juvenile justice reformers have pushed "emerging adult" reforms in states like Massachusetts, Washington, and Illinois, proposing sentence mitigation, extended parole reviews, or blended juvenile-adult approaches for 18–25-year-olds based on prefrontal cortex development. In the United Kingdom, it has influenced road safety discussions, with government consultations and proposals citing ongoing frontal lobe development to support longer learner periods, graduated licensing restrictions, and even calls for cognitive tests for drivers under 25. There is also a grassroots movement starting in the 2020s advocating to raise the age of consent to age 25.

== In popular culture ==
The notion that the human brain does not fully mature or develop until age 25 has been seen in popular culture, including film, television, and other forms of media. This has sometimes been presented as an explanation for differences in judgment and behavior between adolescents and adults, despite the lack of a singular age at which brain development is considered complete.

A story element in In Time (2011) is that people stop aging at age 25. Director Andrew Niccol said that the choice of 25 was influenced by the belief that the frontal lobe is not fully developed until that age. He rationalized it as follows: "In the film, none of them have the luxury of dementia. Their mind is still fresh, so you remember all the crappy things you've done in your life. There's a reason I chose the age of 25 in the movie: The frontal lobe that controls impulse and recklessness doesn't fully develop until then. That's why most rental cars won't rent you a car until you're 25. If I'd known that sooner, I could have blamed all of the crazy [stuff] I did on my youth."

In the 2024 Netflix series The Madness, a character states that the average brain does not fully develop until age 25 while discussing the effects of cannabis and decision-making in young people.

It has frequently been used for jokes concerning actor Leonardo DiCaprio's dating history of women under age 25. The myth is also used in age-gap relationship discourse regarding the morality of being with a younger person.
