= Resources about Martin Luther =

List of works by and about Martin Luther, the German theologian

This is a selected list of works by and about Martin Luther, the German theologian. The emphasis is on English language materials.

== Works by Luther ==
=== Catalog ===
Chronological catalog of Luther's life events, letters, and works with citations, 478 pages, 5.45 MB

- LettersLuther4.doc

=== Earliest editions ===
==== Wittenberg edition ====
Nineteen volumes published between 1539 and 1558. Twelve volumes of German and seven volumes of Latin works.

- Volume 7, 1558, Wittenberg, Thomam Klug

==== Jena edition ====
Twelve volumes published between 1555 and 1558: eight volumes of German and four of Latin works. Two supplementary volumes were published at Eisleben, 1564–1565.

Jena Edition (German):

- Part 1 (1555) Christian Rödinger.
- Part 2 (1555) Christian Rödinger.
- Part 3 (1556) Christian Rödinger.
- Part 4 (1557) Christian Rödinger
- Part 5 (1557) Christian Rödinger.
- Part 6 (1557) Christian Rödinger.
- Part 7 (1558) Heirs of Christian Rödinger ("Christian Rödingers Erben")
- Part 8 (1558) Heirs of Christian Rödinger ("Christian Rödingers Erben")
- Supplement Part 1 (Published in Eisleben, 1564)
- Supplement Part 2 (Published in Eisleben, 1565)
- Table Talk (Published in Eisleben, 1566)

Jena Edition (Latin):

- Volume 1 (1556)
- Volume 2 (1557)
- Volume 3 (1557)
- Volume 4 (1558)

=== Collected works in German ===
- D. Martin Luthers Werke, Kritische Gesamtausgabe. 70 vols. Weimar: Verlag Hermann Böhlaus Nachfolger, 1883-.

- Luther, Martin. D. Martin Luthers Werke, Kritische Gesamtausgabe, 3 Band. Weimar: Verlag Hermann Böhlaus Nachfolger, 1885.
- Luther, Martin. D. Martin Luthers Werke, Kritische Gesamtausgabe, 13 Band. Weimar: Verlag Hermann Böhlaus Nachfolger, 1889.
- Luther, Martin. D. Martin Luthers Werke, Kritische Gesamtausgabe, 25 Band. Weimar: Verlag Hermann Böhlaus Nachfolger, 1902.

=== Translated collected works ===
- Lull, Timothy. Martin Luther Basic Theological Writings. Fortress Press 3rd edition 2012.
- The Works of Martin Luther. 6 vol. Ed. and trans. by Adolph Spaeth, L. D. Reed, Henry Eyster Jacobs, et al. Philadelphia: A. J. Holman Company. 1915.
- Select works Vol. II, tr. Henry Cole. London: W. Simkin and R. Marshall, 1826.
- Select works Vol. III, tr. Henry Cole. London: W. Simkin and R. Marshall, 1826.
- Martin Luther's Writings (Largest Online English Luther Library)
- Luther, Martin. Luther's Works. 55 Volumes. Various translators. St. Louis, Minneapolis: Concordia Publishing House, Fortress Press, 1957–1986.

=== Luther's German Bible translation ===
- D. Martin Luthers Werke, Kritische Gesamtausgabe. Die Deutsche Bibel. 12 vols. Weimar: Verlag Hermann Böhlaus Nochfolger, 1906-61.
- Die Luther-Bibel von 1534. Kolorierte Faksimileausgabe, 2 Bände und Begleitband (v. Stephan Füssel), Taschen Verlag, 2002 (Rezension und einige schöne Auszüge)
- Biblia Germanica. Luther-Übersetzung 1545, Ausgabe letzter Hand. Faksimilierte Handausgabe nach dem im Besitz der Deutschen Bibelgesellschaft befindlichen Originaldruck; einspaltig. Mit zahlreichen Initialen und Holzschnitten des Meisters MS, an deren Gestaltung Luther selbst mitgewirkt hat. Deutsche Bibelgesellschaft, 1967. ISBN 3-438-05501-5
- D. Martin Luther. Die gantze Heilige Schrifft. Der komplette Originaltext von 1545 in modernem Schriftbild. Hrsg. von Hans Volz unter Mitarbeit von Heinz Blanke; Textredaktion Friedrich Kur. Rogner & Bernhard, München 1972 (Neuausgabe: Ed. Lempertz, Bonn 2004), ISBN 3-933070-56-2
- Die Luther-Bibel. Originalausgabe 1545 und revidierte Fassung 1912 (CD-ROM), Digitale Bibliothek 29, Berlin 2002, ISBN 3-89853-129-5 (Es handelt sich um Luthers frühneuhochdeutschen Text.)
- Wikisource Lutherbibel
- Die Bibel (lateinisch/deutsch)
- Audio Bibel in der Lutherübersetzung zum Download
- Lutherbibel von 1984
- "Text der Lutherbibel von 1912". spiegel.de. Archived from the original on June 17, 2002.
- Lutherdeutsch.de

=== Letters in German ===
- D. Martin Luthers Werke, Kritische Gesamtausgabe. Briefwechsel. 18 vols. Weimar: Verlag Hermann Böhlaus Nachfolger, 1930-85.
- Dr. Martin Luthers Sämmtliche Werke. Briefwechsel. Ed. Ernst Ludwig Enders. Calw and Stuttgart.
- Dr. Martin Luthers Sämmtliche Werke. Briefwechsel, Vierter Band. Ed. Ernst Ludwig Enders. Calw and Stuttgart, 1891.
- Dr. Martin Luthers Sämmtliche Werke. Briefwechsel Fünfter Band. Ed. Ernst Ludwig Enders. Calw and Stuttgart, 1893.
- Dr. Martin Luthers Sämmtliche Werke. Briefwechsel, Sechster Band. Ed. Ernst Ludwig Enders. Calw and Stuttgart, 1895.
- Dr. Martin Luthers Sämmtliche Werke. Briefwechsel, Achter Band. Ed. Ernst Ludwig Enders. Calw and Stuttgart, 1898.
- Dr. Martin Luthers Sämmtliche Werke. Briefwechsel, Zehnter Band. Ed. Ernst Ludwig Enders. Calw and Stuttgart, 1903.

=== Letters in English ===
- Luther's Correspondence and Other Contemporary Letters, 2 vols., tr.and ed. by Preserved Smith, Charles Michael Jacobs, The Lutheran Publication Society, Philadelphia, Pa. 1913, 1918. Vol. 1 (1507-1521) and Vol. 2 (1521-1530) from Google Books. Reprint of Vol. 1, Wipf & Stock Publishers (March 2006). ISBN 1-59752-601-0
- Letters of Martin Luther, tr. Margaret A. Currie. London: Macmillan, 1908.
- Luther's Letters to Women, ed. K. Zimmermann, tr. Malcolm. London: Chapman and Hall, 1865.
- A Simple Rite for the Ministry of a Pastor with a Demonically-Afflicted Person (Letter to Severin Schulze, June 1, 1545) from Luther: Letters of Spiritual Counsel. Philadelphia: The Westminster Press, 1960, p. 52.)

=== English works ===
- The Antichrist, Diggory Press 2007, ISBN 978-1-84685-804-8
- The Word of God, Diggory Press 2007, ISBN 978-1-84685-683-9

=== Original works online ===
- "Works by Resources about Martin Luther". Zeno.org (in German).
- Project Wittenberg, an archive of Lutheran documents
- 95 Theses (study guide)
- Smalcald Articles Archived 2008-08-29 at the Wayback Machine
- Small Catechism
- Large Catechism Archived 2008-06-12 at the Wayback Machine
- Excerpts from Against the Murderous, Thieving Peasants
- Martin Luther against Henry King of England trans. Buchanan, E.S. New York: Charles A. Swift, 1928
- Full text of Luther Against the King of England also in:
- Luther in England, or an answer by Anticipation: to a Certain Member of Parliament, and Student of Christ Church, Oxford, ed. by a late fellow of Oriel College, London, E. Palmer and Son, 1841, pp. 5–69. ISBN 1-4370-3005-X ISBN 978-1-4370-3005-1
- The Bondage of the Will. Cole, Henry, London: W. Simkin and R. Marshall, 1823. (covenanter.org)
- The Bondage of the Will. Cole, Henry, London: W. Simkin and R. Marshall, 1823. (Google Books)
- Concerning Christian Liberty. New York: P. F. Collier & Son, 1910 (Part One) (Part Two) (Part Three)
- Disputation On the Divinity and Humanity of Christ. (February 27, 1540) trans. Brown, Christopher.
- Authority of Councils and Churches. tr. by C.B. Smyth. London: William Edward Painter, 1847.
- Temporal Authority: To What Extent it Should Be Obeyed, 1523.
- The Babylonian Captivity of the Church. trans. Steinhaeuser, Albert T.W. Philadelphia: A. J. Holman Company. 1915.
- An Open Letter to the Christian Nobility of the German Nation. trans. Jacobs, C.M. in Works of Martin Luther With Introduction and Notes, Vol. 2. Philadelphia: A.J. Holman Co., 1915.
- The Freedom of the Christian (On www.theologynetwork.org)
- The First Commandment (On www.theologynetwork.org)

=== Commentaries ===
- A manual of the Book of psalms: Or, The Subject-contents of All the Psalms, tr. Henry Cole. London: R.B. Seeley and W. Burnside, 1837.
- Commentary on the Epistle to the Galatians, tr. Theodore Graebner. Grand Rapids, Michigan: Zondervan Publishing House, 1949.
- A commentary on Saint Paul's Epistle to the Galatians, London: B. Blake, 1833.
- A commentary on St. Paul's Epistle to the Galatians Philadelphia: Smith, English & Co. Miller and Burlock, 1860.
- Preface to the Letter of St. Paul to the Romans trans. Thornton, Andrew. Munich: Roger & Bernhard. 1972, vol. 2, pp. 2254–2268.

=== Sermons ===
- A Selection of the Most Celebrated Sermons of Martin Luther, ed. K. Zimmermann, tr. Malcolm. New York: S. & D. A. Forbes, 1830
- How Christians Should Regard Moses. trans. Bachmann, Theodore E. in Luther's Works (first ed., now public domain): Word and Sacrament I, Vol. 35. Philadelphia: Muhlenberg Press, 1960, 161–174.
- Dr. Martin Luther's House-Postil Vol. 2. Columbus, Ohio: Schulze, J.A. 1884.
- Luther's Christmas Sermons: Epistles Vol. 1. trans. Lenker, Nicholas John et al. Minneapolis: Luther Press, 1908.
- Sermons on the Passion of Christ. Rock Island, Illinois: Lutheran Augustana Book Concern, 1871.
- Martin Luther's Christmas 1531 five-sermon series on Isaiah 9:6, translated into English by Nathaniel J. Biebert and unavailable in the American Edition or any other collection of Luther's sermons, can be found here.

=== Autobiography ===
- The Life of Luther Written by Himself, ed. M. Michelet. tr. William Hazlitt. London: George Bell and Sons, 1904.

=== Music ===
- Luther: Hymns, Ballads, Chants, Truth. 4 CD recording. St. Louis: Concordia Publishing House, 2005.
- Martin Luther's Spiritual Songs, tr. Richard Massie. Chester: Hatchard & Son, 1854.
- The Hymns of Martin Luther: Set to their original melodies; with an English version. ed. Bacon, Leonard Woolsey and Allen, Nathan H. Publishers: Charles Scribner's Sons, New York - 1883, Hodder & Stoughton, London - 1884.
- List of Luther's Hymns

=== Table talk ===
- D. Martin Luthers Werke, Kritische Gesamtausgabe. Tischreden. 6 vols. Weimar: Verlag Hermann Böhlaus Nochfolger, 1912–21.
- Luther's table talk; or, Some choice fragments from the familiar discourse of that godly man. ed. & trans. Charles Heel et al. London: A. & R. Spottiswoode. 1832
- Luther's Table Talk: A Critical Study. New York: Columbia University Press, 1907. ISBN 0-7905-3865-2 from Google Books
- Table Talk. London: Religious Tract Society.

=== Small and Large Catechism ===
- "The Large Catechism." Concordia: The Lutheran Confessions: A Reader's Edition of the Book of Concord. Tr. W. H. T. Dau and G. F. Bente. Rev. and Updated by P. T. McCain, R. C. Baker, G. E. Veith and E. A. Engelbrecht. St. Louis: Concordia Publishing House, 2005, 375–470.
- Triglot Concordia. tr. and ed. F. Bente and W. H.T. Dau. St. Louis: Concordia Publishing House, 1921.
- "Enchiridion: The Small Catechism." Concordia: The Lutheran Confessions: A Reader's Edition of the Book of Concord. Tr. W. H. T. Dau and G. F. Bente. Rev. and Updated by P. T. McCain, R. C. Baker, G. E. Veith and E. A. Engelbrecht. St. Louis: Concordia Publishing House, 2005, 333–374.
- Triglot Concordia. tr. and ed. F. Bente and W. H.T. Dau. St. Louis: Concordia Publishing House, 1921.

=== Smalcald articles ===
- "The Smalcald Articles." Concordia: The Lutheran Confessions: A Reader's Edition of the Book of Concord. Tr. W. H. T. Dau and G. F. Bente. Rev. and Updated by P. T. McCain, R. C. Baker, G. E. Veith and E. A. Engelbrecht. St. Louis: Concordia Publishing House, 2005, 279–313.
1. Triglot Concordia. Tr. and ed. W. H. T. Dau and G. F. Bente. St. Louis: Concordia Publishing House, 1921.

== Works about Luther ==
=== Books and articles ===
- Acton, John (1906). "Luther" . Lectures on Modern History (1st ed.). London: Macmillan and Company. pp. 90–107.
- Bainton, Roland (1950). Here I Stand: A Life of Martin Luther. Nashville: Abingdon Press. ISBN 0-687-16893-7.
- Booth, Edwin P. (1995). Harmon, Dan (ed.). Martin Luther, the Great Reformer. Heroes of the Faith. Uhrischsville, Ohio: Barbour and Co. ISBN 1-55748-727-8.
- Bornkamm, Heinrich (1983). Luther in Mid-Career 1521-1530. Translated by Bachmann, E. Theodore. Philadelphia: Fortress Press. ISBN 0-8006-0692-2.
- Bornkamm, Heinrich (1958). Luther's World of Thought. Translated by Bertram, Martin H. St. Louis: Concordia Publishing House. ISBN 0-7586-0832-2.
- Brecht, Martin (1985–1993). Martin Luther. Translated by Schaaf, James L. Philadelphia: Fortress Press. ISBN 0-8006-2814-4, ISBN 0-8006-2814-4, ISBN 0-8006-2815-2, a standard scholarly biography excerpts
- Cole, Richard G. (Autumn 1984). "Reformation Printers: Unsung Heroes". Sixteenth Century Journal. 15 (3): 327–339. doi:10.2307/2540767. JSTOR 2540767.
- d'Aubigné, Jean-Henri Merle (1996). Sidwell, Mark (ed.). The Triumph of Truth: A Life of Martin Luther. Translated by White, Henry. Greenville, South Carolina: Bob Jones University Press. ISBN 0-89084-876-9.
- Dickens, Arthur Geoffrey (1967). Martin Luther and the Reformation. New York: Harper and Row. ASIN B0007DY59M.
- Edwards, Mark U. (1994). Printing, propaganda, and Martin Luther. Berkeley: University of California Press. ISBN 9780393310368.
- Erikson, Erik H. (1958). Young Man Luther: A Study in Psychoanalysis and History. New York: W. W. Norton & Company. ISBN 9780393310368.
- Fife, R. H. (1957). The Revolt of Martin Luther. New York: Columbia University Press.
- Friedenthal, Richard (1970). Luther, His Life and Times. Translated by Nowell, John. New York: Harcourt, Brace, Jovanovich. ISBN 9780151547852. Translation of the author's Luther, sein Leben und seine Zeit.
- Granquist, Mark A.; Haemig, Mary Jane (2017). Dictionary of Luther and The Lutheran Traditions. Grand Rapids: Baker Academic.
- Gerrish, Brian (1982). Old Protestantism and the New. Edinburgh: T. & T. Clark.
- Green, Lowell C. (1980). How Melanchthon Helped Luther Discover the Gospel. Attic Press.
- Gretzschez, Matthias (2016). Martin Luther and His Places of Work. Hamburg: Ellert and Richter Verlag.
- Haile, Harry Gerald (1980). Luther: An Experiment in Biography. Garden City, New York: Doubleday & Company. ISBN 0-385-15960-9.
- Hamm, Brent (2017). The Early Luther. Minneapolis: Fortress Press.
- Harline, Craig (2017). World Ablaze: The Rise of Martin Luther and the Birth of the Reformation. Oxford: Oxford University Press.
- Hendrix, Scott H. (1981). Luther and the Papacy. Philadelphia: Fortress Press. ISBN 0-8006-0658-2.
- Hendrix, Scott H. (2009). Luther. Abingdon Pillars of Theology. Nashville: Abingdon Press. ISBN 978-0-687-65641-7.
- Hendrix, Scott H. (2007). "Martin Luther, Reformer". The Cambridge History of Christianity. Vol. 6: Reform and Expansion 1500-1600. Cambridge: Cambridge University Press. pp. 3–19. ISBN 978-0-521-81162-0.
- Hillerbrand, Hans J. (2007). "Martin Luther". Encyclopædia Britannica. Chicago: Encyclopædia Britannica, Inc.
- Holborn, Louise W. (June 1942). "Printing and the Growth of a Protestant Movement in Germany from 1517 to 1524". Church History. 11 (2): 123–137. doi:10.2307/3160291. JSTOR 3160291. S2CID 162909935.
- Kaufmann, Thomas (2016). A Short Life of Martin Luther. Translated by Krey, Peter D. S.; Bratt, James D. Grand Rapids: Wm. B. Eerdmans Publishing Co. ISBN 978-0-8028-7153-4.
- Kittelson, James M. (2016). Luther the Reformer: The Story of the Man and His Career (Second ed.). Minneapolis: Augsburg Publishing House. ISBN 978-0-8066-2240-8.
- Kolb, Robert (2000). Martin Luther As Prophet, Teacher, Hero: Images of the Reformer, 1520-1620. Grand Rapids: Baker Book House. ISBN 0-8010-2214-2.
- Kostlin, Julius (1883). The Life of Martin Luther. Philadelphia: Lutheran Publication Society. Reissued in modern English by Vision Press (2017).
- Lindsay, Thomas M. (1970) [1900]. Luther and the German Reformation. Freeport, New York: Books for Libraries. ISBN 978-0-8369-5556-9.
- Loewen, Harry (2015). Ink Against the Devil. Waterloo, Ontario: Wilfrid Laurier University Press.
- Lohse, Bernard (1997). Martin Luther: An Introduction To His Life And Thought. Edinburgh: T. & T. Clark.
- Lovy, René-Jacques (1983). Luther. Quadrige, 49 (in French) (2e ed.). Paris: Presses universitaires de France.
- Lull, Timothy F.; Nelson, Derek R. (2015). Resilient Reformer: The Life And Thought Of Martin Luther. Minneapolis: Fortress Press.
- MacCulloch, Diarmaid (2003). The Reformation: Europe's House Divided 1490-1700. London: BBC Books. ISBN 0-7139-9370-7.
- Malessa, Andreas (2017). The Unreformed Luther. Grand Rapids: Kregel Publications. (originally published in German as Hier stehe ich, es war ganz anders (2015) by SCM-Verlag)
- Manns, Richard (1982). Martin Luther: An Illustrated Biography. New York: Crossroad Publishing Company. ISBN 0-8245-0510-7.
- Mansch, Larry; Peters, Curtis (2003). Martin Luther: The Life and Lessons. Jefferson, North Carolina: McFarland & Company.
- Marius, Richard (1999). Martin Luther: The Christian between God and Death. Cambridge, Massachusetts: Harvard University Press. ISBN 0-8245-0510-7.
- Markwald, Rudolf K.; Markwald, Marilynn Morris (2002). Katharina Von Bora: A Reformation Life. St. Louis: Concordia Publishing House. ISBN 978-0-7586-0000-4.
- Marty, Martin (2008) [2004]. Martin Luther: A Life. Penguin lives. New York: Penguin Group. ISBN 978-0-670-03272-3.
- McGoldrick, James Edward (1979). Luther's English Connection: the Reformation Thought of Robert Barnes and [of] William Tyndale. Milwaukee: Northwestern Publishing House. ISBN 0-8100-0070-9.
- McKim, Donald K., ed. (2003). The Cambridge Companion to Martin Luther. New York: Cambridge University Press.
- Michael, Robert (2006). Holy Hatred: Christianity, Antisemitism, and the Holocaust. New York: Palgrave Macmillan.
- Meggs, Philip B. (1998). A History of Graphic Design. New York: John Wiley & Sons.
- Metaxas, Eric (2017). Martin Luther. New York: Viking Press.; reviewer states, "Luther portrayed here is a hero cast in a Whiggish mold, a titanic figure who single-handedly slays the dragon of the Dark Ages, rescues God from an interpretive dungeon, invents individual freedom and ushers in modernity."
- Montgomery, John Warwick (1970). In Defense of Martin Luther: Essays. Milwaukee: Northwestern Publishing House.
- Mullett, Michael A. (2014). Martin Luther (2nd ed.). London: Routledge. ISBN 9780415734073.
- Nettl, Paul. Luther and Music. Trans. by Frida Best and Ralph Wood. New York: Russell & Russell, 1967, cop. 1948. vii, 174 p.
- Noble, Graham. "Martin Luther and German anti-Semitism," History Review (2002) No. 42:1-2.
- Nohl, Frederick. Luther: Biography of a Reformer. St. Louis: Concordia Publishing House, 2003. ISBN 0-7586-0651-6
- Oberman, Heiko A. Luther: Man Between God and the Devil. New York: Doubleday, 1989. ISBN 0-385-42278-4
- Oberman, Heiko A. The Roots of Anti-Semitism in the Age of Renaissance and Reformation.
- James I. Porter, trans. Philadelphia: Fortress Press, 1984. ISBN 0-8006-0709-0
- Pettegree, Andrew. Brand Luther. New York: Penguin Books 2015. 379p
- Plass, Ewald M. This Is Luther: A Character Study. St. Louis: Concordia Publishing House, 1948 [Reprint, 1984]. ISBN 0-570-03942-8.
- Plass, Ewald M. "Monasticism," in What Luther Says: An Anthology. St. Louis: Concordia Publishing House, 1959, 2:964.
- Polack, W.G. The Story of Luther. St. Louis: Concordia Publishing House, 1931.
- Reston, James. Luther's Fortress: Martin Luther and His Reformation Under Siege. 2015 New York:Basic Books. 255p
- Reu, John Michael. Luther and the Scriptures. Columbus, Ohio: The Wartburg Press, 1944. [Reprint: St. Louis: Concordia Publishing House, 1980].
- Reu, John Michael. Luther's German Bible: An Historical Presentation Together with a Collection of Sources. Columbus, Ohio: The Lutheran Book Concern, 1934. [Reprint: St. Louis: Concordia Publishing House, 1984].
- Ritter, Gerhard. Luther: His Life and Work. John Riches, trans. New York: Harper & Row, 1963. ISBN 0-313-20347-4.
- Schaff, Philip. History of the Christian Church. 8 vols. New York: Charles Scribner's Sons, 1910.
- Schreiber, Clara Seuel. Katherine, Wife of Luther. Pbk. ed. Milwaukee, Wis.: Northwestern Publishing House, 1972. N.B.: Biogrqaphy of Katharina Luther (née von Bora).
- Schuetze, Armin. Martin Luther: Reformer. Milwaukee, Northwestern Publishing House 2nd.Edition 2005
- Schwiebert, E.G. Luther and His Times. St. Louis: Concordia Publishing House, 1950. ISBN 0-570-03246-6.
- Scribner, Robert W. For the Sake of Simple Folk: Popular Propaganda for the German Reformation Cambridge University Press, 1981.
- Selderhuis, Herman. Martin Luther. Crossway 2017.
- Siemon-Netto, Uwe. The Fabricated Luther: the Rise and Fall of the Shirer Myth. Peter L. Berger, Foreword. St. Louis: Concordia Publishing House, 1995. ISBN 0-570-04800-1.
- Smith, Preserved.
- Spaeth, Adolph. An Original Account of Luther's death, Recently Discovered in the Krauth Memorial Library, Mount Airy, [reprint from The Lutheran church review, v. 29, no. 2, pp. 313–325] (1910)
- Stanford, Peter. Martin Luther: Catholic Dissident. Hodder 2017. ISBN 978-1-473-62167-1
- Steinmetz David. Luther In Context. Baker Academic. Revised Edition 2002
- Stöhr, Martin. "Die Juden und Martin Luther," in Kremers, Heinz et al. (eds.) Martin Luther und die Juden; die Juden und Martin Luther. Neukirchener publishing house, Neukirchen Vluyn 1985, 1987 (2. Edition). p. 90.
- Swihart, Altman K. Luther and the Lutheran Church, 1483-1960. New York: Philosophical Library, 1960.
- Thompson, Mark D. A Sure Ground on Which to Stand: The Relation of Authority and Interpretive Method in Luther's Approach to Scripture. Carlisle: Paternoster, 2004. ISBN 1-84227-145-8
- Tjernagel, Neelak S. Martin Luther and the Jewish People. Milwaukee: Northwestern Publishing House, 1985. ISBN 0-8100-0213-2
- Todd, John M. Luther: A Life. New York: Crossroad Publishing Company, 1982. ISBN 0-8245-0479-8 (Also at)
- Triglot Concordia. Tr. and ed. W. H. T. Dau and G. F. Bente. St. Louis: Concordia Publishing House, 1921.

=== Audio ===
- Martin Luther: Hymns, Ballads, Chants, Truth.
- Introducing...Martin Luther. Four lectures by Dr. Michael Reeves on Luther's life and influence (on www.theologynetwork.org)

=== Films ===
- 1953: Martin Luther, theatrical film, with Niall MacGinnis as Luther; directed by Irving Pichel. Academy Award nominations for black & white cinematography and art/set direction. Re-released in 2002 on DVD in 4 languages.
- 1974: Luther, theatrical film (MPAA rating: PG), with Stacy Keach as Luther. Adapted from John Osborne's play.
- 1981: Where Luther Walked, documentary featuring Roland Bainton as guide and narrator, directed by Ray Christensen (VHS released in 1992), ISBN 1-56364-012-0
- 1983: Martin Luther: Heretic, TV presentation with Jonathan Pryce as Luther, directed by Norman Stone.
- 1983: Martin Luther: An Eye on Augsburg, a film funded by the Northern Illinois District of the Lutheran Church–Missouri Synod with Rev. Robert Clausen as Luther.
- 2001: Opening the Door to Luther, travelogue hosted by Rick Steves. Sponsored by the Evangelical Lutheran Church in America.
- 2002: Martin Luther, a historical film from the Lion TV/PBS Empires series, with Timothy West as Luther, narrated by Liam Neeson and directed by Cassian Harrison.
- 2003: Luther, theatrical release (MPAA rating: PG-13), with Joseph Fiennes as Luther and directed by Eric Till. Partially funded by American and German Lutheran groups.

=== Historiography ===
- Dickens, A. G., and John M. Tonkin. The Reformation in Historical Thought (Harvard University Press,. 1985) 443 pp. excerpt
- Gassmann, Günther, and Mark W. Oldenburg. Historical dictionary of Lutheranism (Scarecrow Press, 2011).
- Landry, Stan Michael. That all may be one? Church unity, Luther memory, and ideas of the German nation, 1817–1883 (PhD dissertation, University of Arizona, 2010) online. bibliography pp 242–66.
- Lehmann, Hartmut. Martin Luther in the American imagination (W. Fink, 1988).
- * Scribner, Robert W. "Incombustible Luther: the image of the reformer in early modern Germany." Past & Present 110 (1986): 38–68. online
- Stayer, James M. Martin Luther, German saviour: German evangelical theological factions and the interpretation of Luther, 1917-1933 (McGill-Queen's Press-MQUP, 2000).
- Tracy, James D., ed. Luther and the modern state in Germany (Truman State University Press, 1986).
- Wallman, Johannes. "The Reception of Luther's Writings on the Jews from the Reformation to the End of the 19th Century". Lutheran Quarterly 1 (Spring 1987): 72–97.
- Zeeden, E.W. The Legacy of Luther: Martin Luther and the Reformation in the Estimation of the German Lutherans from Luther's Death to the Beginning of the Age of Goethe (London: Hollis and Carter, 1954).

== Online information on Luther and his work ==
- Here I Stand, a biography by Ronald Bainton
- KDG Wittenberg's Luther site (7 languages)
- Christian Cyclopedia: Martin Luther
- Martin Luther – ReligionFacts.com
- Martin Luther – PBS movie
- The Life of Martin Luther
- New Schaff-Herzog Encyclopedia of Religious Knowledge article on "Luther, Martin"
- Martin Luther - Eine Bibliographie (German)
- Works by Martin Luther at Project Gutenberg
- The "seat" of the Reformation - (BBC News)
- Catholic Encyclopedia: Martin Luther
- Jewish Encyclopedia: Martin Luther
- Martin Luther and the German Reformation
- Luther's Men - Discuss Theology and Beer
- Luther On Islam
