= Psychosocial =

Influence that psychological factors and social environment has on well-being

The psychosocial approach looks at individuals in the context of the combined influence that psychological factors and the surrounding social environment have on their physical and mental wellness and their ability to function. This approach is used in a broad range of helping professions in health and social care settings as well as by medical and social science researchers.

== Background ==
Psychiatrist Dr. Adolf Meyer in the late 19th century stated that: "We cannot understand the individual presentation of mental illness, [and perpetuating factors] without knowing how that person functions in the environment." Psychosocial assessment stems from this idea. The relationship between mental and emotional wellbeing and the environment was first commonly applied by Freudian ego-psychologist Professor Erik Erikson in his description of the stages of psychosocial development in his book called Childhood and Society in 1950. Mary Richmond considered there to be a strict relationship between cause and effect, in a diagnostic process. In 1941 Gordon Hamilton renamed the existing (1917) concept of "social diagnosis" as "psychosocial study".

Psychosocial study was further developed by psychosocial therapist professor Florence Hollis in 1964 with emphasis on treatment model. It is in tension with diverse social psychology, which attempts to explain social patterns within the individual. Problems that occur in one's psychosocial functioning can be referred to as "psychosocial dysfunction" or "psychosocial morbidity." That refers to the lack of development or diverse atrophy of the psychosocial self, often occurring alongside other dysfunctions that may be physical, emotional, or cognitive in nature. There is now a cross-disciplinary field of study, and organisations such as the Transcultural Psychosocial Organization (United Nations High Commissioner for Refugees), and Association for Psychosocial Studies.

== Psychosocial assessment and intervention ==
Psychosocial assessment considers several key areas related to psychological, biological, and social functioning and the availability of supports. It is a systematic inquiry that arises from the introduction of dynamic interaction; it is an ongoing process that continues throughout a treatment, and is characterized by the circularity of cause-effect/effect-cause. In assessment, the clinician/health care professional identifies the problem with the client, takes stock of the resources that are available for dealing with it, and considers the ways in which it might be solved from an educated hypothesis formed by data collection. This hypothesis is tentative in nature and goes through a process of elimination, refinement, or reconstruction in the light of newly obtained data.

There are five internal steps in assessment:

1. Data collection (relevant and current) of the problem presented.
2. Integrating collected facts with relevant theories.
3. Formulating a hypothesis (case theory) that gives the presented problem more clarity.
4. Hypothesis substantiation through exploration of the problem: life history of the client, etiology, personality, environment, stigmas, etc.
5. Further integration of newer facts identified in the treatment period and preparing a psychosocial report for psychosocial intervention.

Assessment includes psychiatric, psychological and social functioning, risks posed to the individual and others, problems required to address from any co-morbidity, personal circumstances including family or other carers. Other factors are the person's housing, financial and occupational status, and physical needs. Assessments when categorized, it particularly includes Life history of the client that include data collection of living situation and finances, social history and supports, family history, coping skills, religious/cultural factors, trauma from systemic issues or abuse and medico-legal factors (assessment of the client's awareness of legal documents, surrogate decision-making, power of attorney and consent). Components include: the resource assessment of psycho-spiritual strengths; substance abuse; coping mechanisms, styles and patterns (individual, family level, workplace, and use of social support systems); sleeping pattern; needs and impacts of the problem etc. Advanced clinicians incorporate individual scales, batteries and testing instruments in their assessments. In the late 1980s psychologist professor Hans Eysenck, in an issue of Psychological Inquiry, raised controversies on then assessment methods and it gave way to comprehensive Bio-Psycho-Social assessment. This theoretical model sees behavior as a function of biological factors, psychological issues and the social context. Qualified healthcare professionals conduct the physiological part of these assessments. This thrust on biology expands the field of approach for the client, with the client, through the interaction of these disciplines in a domain where mental illnesses are physical, just as physical conditions have mental components. Likewise, the emotional is both psychological and physical.

The clinician's comprehension and set of judgments about the client's situation, the assessment through a theory of each case, predicts the intervention. Hence a good psychosocial assessment leads to a good psychosocial intervention that aims to reduce complaints and improve functioning related to mental disorders and/or social problems (e.g., problems with personal relationships, work, or school) by addressing the different psychological and social factors influencing the individual. For example, a psychosocial intervention for an older adult client with a mental disorder might include psychotherapy and a referral to a psychiatrist while also addressing the caregiver's needs in an effort to reduce stress for the entire family system as a method of improving the client's quality of life. Treatment for psychosocial disorders in a medical model usually only involve using drugs and talk therapy.

== Psychosocial adaptation and support ==
Psychosocial adaptation is a process a person experiences in order to achieve good fitness in person-environment congruence known as adjustment, a state of wisdom oriented activities and psychosocial equilibrium. Psychosocial support is the provision of psychological and social resources to a person by a supporter intended for the benefit of the receiver's ability to cope with problems faced. The allocentric principle within social relationships that promote health and well-being moves individuals to aid victims of terminal illness, disaster, war, catastrophe or violence to foster resilience of communities and individuals. It aims at easing resumption of normal life, facilitating affected people's participation to their convalescence and preventing pathological consequences of potentially traumatic situations. This might extend in forms of informational and instrumental support.

== See also ==
- Psychosocial distress
- Psychosocial needs
- Psychological trauma
- Mental status examination
- Psychosocial – a song by Slipknot on their 2008 album All Hope Is Gone.
