= Roland H. Bainton =

American historian

- Born: March 30, 1894; Ilkeston, England
- Died: February 13, 1984 (aged 89); New Haven, Connecticut, U.S.
- Occupation: Historian
- Writing career
- Period: 20th century
- Subject: Reformation history

Roland Herbert Bainton (March 30, 1894 – February 13, 1984) was a British-born American Protestant church historian.

== Life ==
Bainton was born in Ilkeston, Derbyshire, England, and came to the United States in 1902. He received an AB degree from Whitman College, and BD and PhD. degrees from Yale University. He also received a number of honorary degrees including a DD from Meadville Theological Seminary and from Oberlin College, Dr. Theologiae from the University of Marburg, Germany, and LittD from Gettysburg College. A specialist in Reformation history, Bainton was for 42 years Titus Street Professor of ecclesiastical history at Yale Divinity School, and he continued his writing well into his 20 years of retirement.

Bainton's father was a pacifist, and he himself married a Quaker. Graduating from seminary just as World War I began, he was a pacifist and became a conscientious objector. He affiliated with the Society of Friends' unit of the American Red Cross. Although he was ordained as a Congregationalist minister, he never served as the pastor of a congregation.

Bainton wore his scholarship lightly and had a lively, readable style. His most popular books were Here I Stand: A Life of Martin Luther (1950), which sold more than a million copies, and The Reformation of the Sixteenth Century (1952), both of which were widely used as textbooks. In all, he was the author of more than 30 books on Christianity. Many of Bainton's books are illustrated with examples taken from his collection of medieval and Renaissance drawings, woodcuts, and engravings. He was elected a Fellow of the American Academy of Arts and Sciences in 1954.

A collection of essays in honor of Roland Bainton was published in 1962.

== Works ==
=== Here I Stand ===
Bainton published Here I Stand: A Life of Martin Luther in 1950. As of 2019, it is still in print. Kenneth Scott Latourette, in the chapter notes for "Luther and the Rise and Spread of Lutheranism" in his History of Christianity, lauds Bainton's biography of Luther as "A superb combination of accurate scholarship based upon a thorough knowledge of the sources and secondary works with insight, vivid, readable literary style, and reproductions of contemporary illustrations. It also contains so valuable a bibliography as to render needless an extended one in this chapter."

In his chapter on Luther's writings in Invitation to the Classics, Mark A. Noll singles out Bainton's biography: "Of the many superlative treatments, a half-century old study by Roland Bainton, Here I Stand: A Life of Martin Luther, has justly won a reputation as a classic work on a classic subject."

Bainton was severely critical of Erik Erickson's psychoanalytic biography of Luther, Young Man Luther.

=== The Reformation of the Sixteenth Century ===
This volume went to press in 1952. Its value, also, is acknowledged by Latourette in the chapter notes on "Luther and the Rise and Spread of Lutheranism" (see note on Here I Stand), thus, "An admirable popular brief summary by an outstanding specialist".

=== Other works ===
(Non-exhaustive)

- — (1937). David Joris. Wiedertäufer und Kämpfer für Toleranz. Leipzig, Germany: M. Heinzius Nachf.
- —. The Age of Reformation.
- — (1976). Behold the Christ: A Portrayal of Christ in Words and Pictures. Harper & Row. ISBN 0060603534.
- —. Christian Attitudes Toward War and Peace.
- —. Christianity.
- —. The Church of Our Fathers.
- —. Erasmus of Christendom.
- —. The Travail of Religious Liberty.
- —. Women of the Reformation in France and England.
- —. Women of the Reformation in Germany and Italy.
- — (1940). Bernardino Ochino, esule e riformatore senese del Cinquecento 1487-1563. Firenze, La Nuova Italia.
- — (1964). Christendom: A Short History of Christianity and its Impact on Western Civilization., in two volumes
- —. Early Christianity.
- — (1953). Hunted Heretic: The Life and Death of Michael Servetus, 1511-1553. The Beacon Press.
- — (1964). Sex, Love and Marriage. A Christian survey. Fontana Books.
