= Ego integrity =

Psychological term

Ego integrity was the term given by Erik Erikson to the last of his eight stages of psychosocial development, and used by him to represent 'a post-narcissistic love of the human ego—as an experience which conveys some world order and spiritual sense, no matter how dearly paid for'.

Integrity of the ego can also be used with respect to the development of a reliable sense of self, a reliable sense of other, and an understanding of how those constructs interact to form a person's experience of reality; as well as to the way 'the synthetic function of the ego, though it is of such extraordinary importance, is subject...to a whole number of disturbances'.

== Erikson's formulation ==
Erikson wrote that 'for the fruit of these seven stages I know no better word than ego integrity...the ego's accrued assurance of its proclivity for order and meaning'. Erikson considered that 'if vigor of mind combines with the gift of responsible renunciation, some old people can envisage human problems in their entirety...a living example of the "closure" of a style of life'.

The opposite of ego integrity was despair, as 'signified by fear of death: the one and only life cycle is not accepted as the ultimate of life. Despair expresses the feeling that the time is now too short...to try out alternative roads to integrity'.

'Erikson's hypothesis that maturity involves working through a conflict between integrity and despair over past accomplishments' has received some empirical support: on one measure, 'the resolution of past life stages was more predictive of ego integrity than were other personality variables'.

=== Analogues ===
Gail Sheehy termed the later stage of 'Second Adulthood...Age of Integrity (65-85+)'.

The ninth of Loevinger's stages of ego development was the ' Integrated Stage...and ego integrity versus despair are probably Erikson's version of the Integrated Stage'.

== Integrity of the ego ==
In his structural theory, Sigmund Freud described the ego as the mediator between the id and super-ego and the external world. The task of the ego is to find a balance between primitive drives, morals, and reality, while simultaneously satisfying the id and superego. Freudians saw the ego as forming from separate "nuclei": 'A final ego is formed by synthetic integration of these nuclei, and in certain states of ego regression a split of the ego into its original nuclei becomes observable'.

The main concern of the ego is with safety, ideally only allowing the id's desires to be expressed when the consequences are marginal. Ego defenses are often employed by the ego when id behaviour conflicts with reality and either society's morals, norms, and taboos, or an individual's internalization of these morals, norms, and taboos. Freud noted however that in the face of conflicts with superego or id, it was always 'possible for the ego to avoid a rupture by submitting to encroachments on its own unity and even perhaps by effecting a cleavage or division of itself'. In a late, unfinished paper he examined how sometimes 'the instinct is allowed to retain its satisfaction and proper respect is shown to reality...at the price of a rift in the ego which never heals but increases as time goes on...a splitting of the ego'. Lacan would develop this line of thought, and maintain indeed that 'it is in the disintegration of the imaginary unity constituted by the ego that the subject finds the signifying material of his symptoms'.

From another standpoint, Object relations theory has explored 'the encounter with the "other" that threatens the ego's integrity', as when the object in question is lacking in 'its expected function as "container" of excitations'.

The word ego is taken directly from Greek where it is the nominative of the first person singular personal pronoun and is translated as "I myself" to express emphasis—it is a translation of Freud's German term "Das Ich", which in English would be "the I".

== Cultural examples ==
'In Cicero's De Senectute...old age acquires a meaning identified with the achievement of total self-possession, ego-integrity, and wisdom...Erikson's own psychology, on its normative side, is finally only a restatement of Stoic ideals'.

In his late haiku, 'we see Issa the old man—hundreds of years, thousands of years old, the Old Man of Edward Lear. That is our fate too. We have to die, to become nothing, in order to know the meaning of something'.

== See also ==
- Edward Glover (psychoanalyst)
- Developmental psychology
- Developmental stage theories
- Social Development
