= Gandhi's Truth =

Book by Erik Erikson on Mahatma Gandhi

Gandhi's Truth: On the Origins of Militant Nonviolence
- Cover of the first edition
- Author: Erik H. Erikson
- Language: English
- Subject: Mahatma Gandhi
- Publisher: W. W. Norton
- Publication date: 1969
- Publication place: United States
- Media type: Print (hardcover and paperback)
- Pages: 476 (1989 reprint edition)
- ISBN: 0-393-00741-3 (1989 reprint edition)

Gandhi's Truth: On the Origins of Militant Nonviolence is a 1969 book about Mahatma Gandhi by the German-born American developmental psychologist Erik H. Erikson. It won the Pulitzer Prize for General Nonfiction and the U.S. National Book Award in category Philosophy and Religion.

The book was republished in 1993 by Norton.

== Contents ==
The book examines the psychological development of Mahatma Gandhi alongside the evolution of his religious and political ideas. It reconstructs episodes from Gandhi's childhood in Kathiawar, his student years in London, and experiences in South Africa, relating these periods to his developing ideas about truth, self-discipline and nonviolence.

It studies Gandhi's leadership of the Ahmedabad textile workers' strike of 1918 and the fast he undertook. It became a pivotal moment in development of his personal methods of self-denial, moral persuasion in his practice of satyagraha and his emerging role as a political leader. Erikson applies concepts from psychoanalysis and his own theory of psychosocial development to Gandhi's psychological development and subsequent political action based on nonviolence.
