= Stephen Frosh =

Psychosocial theorist

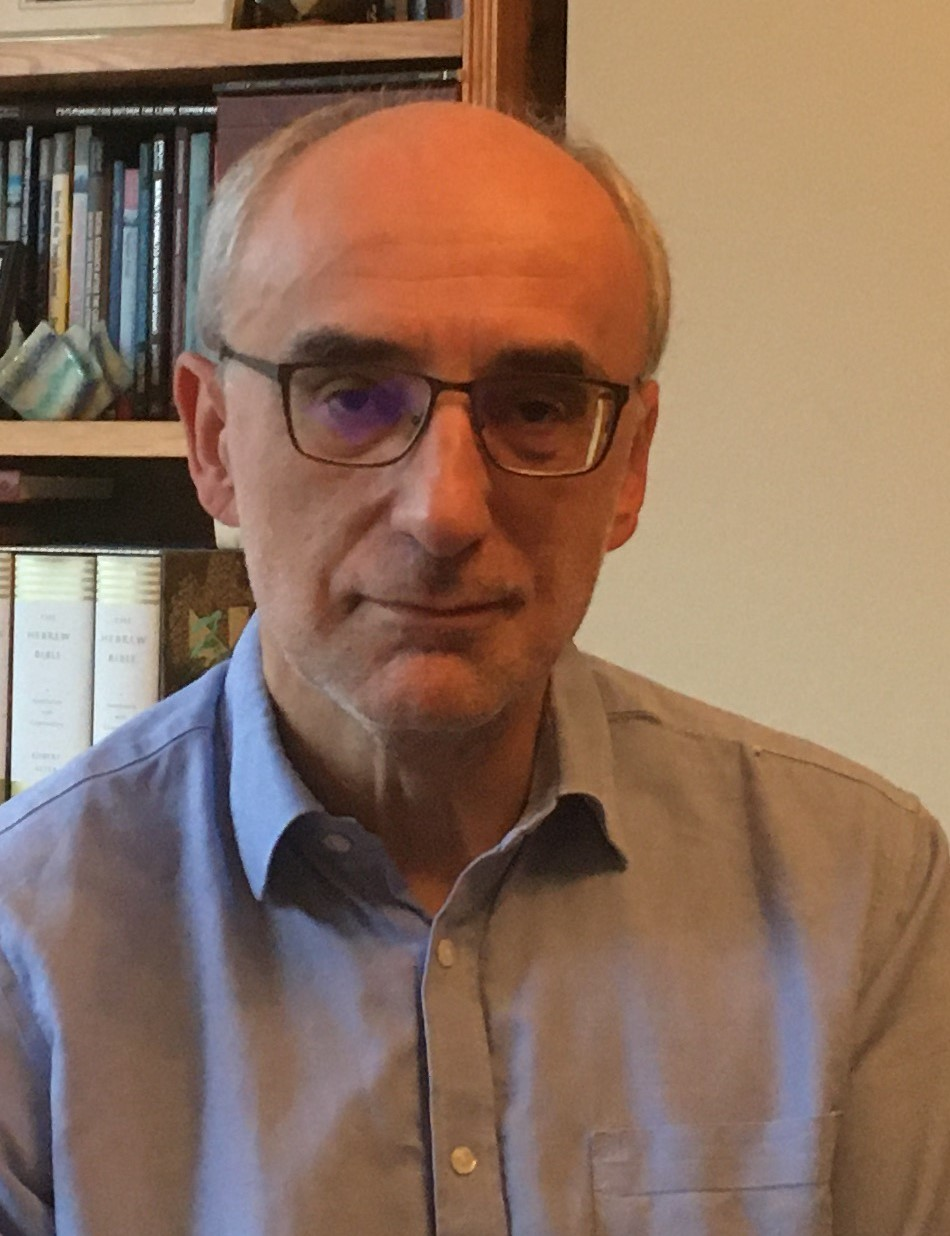
Stephen Frosh

Stephen Frosh (born 1954) is a psychosocial theorist and emeritus Professor of Psychology at Birkbeck, University of London. He is known for his work in psychoanalysis, psychosocial studies and critical theory. Frosh was one of the founders of Birkbeck's Department of Psychosocial Studies, where he worked from its establishment in 2008 until its reorganisation in 2023.

Frosh has a background in both academic and clinical psychology. He was a Consultant Clinical Psychologist and Vice Dean at the Tavistock Clinic throughout the 1990s. He has written many books and articles, contributing to the study of psychoanalysis, antisemitism, gender and postmemory. His book Those Who Come After: Postmemory, Acknowledgement and Forgiveness (Palgrave Macmillan, 2019) won the 2023 British Psychological Society Award for Best Academic Monograph. Frosh has also supervised numerous PhD research theses in psychosocial studies.

Frosh is a Fellow of the Academy of Social Sciences, an Academic Associate of the British Psychoanalytical Society, a Founding Member of the Association of Psychosocial Studies, and an Honorary Member of the Institute of Group Analysis. He has held visiting professorships at the University of Witwatersrand, South Africa, and at the University of São Paulo, Brazil.

== Early life and education ==
Frosh was born in 1954 to Sidney and Ruth Frosh (née Glicksman). His father served as president of the United Synagogue in the 1980s and 1990s and was previously active in Jewish education, known for reforming the childcare charity Norwood.

Frosh completed his undergraduate studies at the University of Sussex, where he met his wife, Judith. Together, they have three children.

== Clinical work and psychoanalysis ==
In 1979, Frosh began work in the Department of Psychology at Birkbeck and in 1982 went part time there while continuing his clinical practice in the NHS. He held a position as a Consultant Clinical Psychologist in the family department at the Tavistock Clinic, a prominent British institution for psychoanalysis. Frosh was appointed professor at Birkbeck in 1998 and ceased his clinical work in 2000.

Frosh's academic contributions include critical examinations of psychoanalysis, particularly in relation to social and ideological structures. His book For and Against Psychoanalysis (1997, revised 2006) examines the strengths and limitations of psychoanalytic thought, engaging with its philosophical, ethical and political implications. He has also examined the intersections of psychoanalysis and Jewishness, notably in his book Hate and the Jewish Science: Anti-Semitism, Nazism and Psychoanalysis (2005). Frosh examines how psychoanalysis has been shaped by Jewish intellectual traditions and experiences of anti-semitism, while exploring the ways in which it has been both vilified and embraced within different political contexts.

His work also engages with issues of memory, trauma and identity, including in relation to the ways in which psychoanalytic theory can help scholars to understand the transgenerational transmission of trauma.

== Psychosocial studies ==
Frosh has played a central role in the development of psychosocial studies, a transdisciplinary field that integrates psychoanalysis with critical social theory to explore the interaction of subjective experience and broader social contexts. In their introduction to The Palgrave Handbook of Psychosocial Studies (2024), Frosh and co-editors note that psychosocial studies is best understood as an exploration of phenomena where both the "social" and the "personal" are in evidence, and as a transdisciplinary perspective which challenges the boundaries between different academic fields like psychoanalysis, sociology, critical psychology, feminism, postcolonial theory and queer theory.

Frosh's early contributions to psychosocial studies date back to the 1980s and 1990s, when he began integrating psychoanalytic theories into social critique. In his 2003 article, "Psychosocial Studies and Psychology: Is a Critical Approach Emerging?", Frosh critiques psychology's claim to scientific neutrality, highlighting its historical and ongoing use by governments and institutions in areas like education, policing and management. This critique laid the groundwork for the development of psychosocial studies as a field that questioned established psychological paradigms and emphasized the political and ideological investments embedded in the discipline.

The formation of Birkbeck's Department of Psychosocial Studies in 2008 followed tensions within the Department of Psychology at Birkbeck, particularly around the dominance of neuroscientific approaches. The new department was designed to house critical work that blends psychoanalysis with social theory and to provide an institutional home for an emerging academic field. This development was significant, as it marked the formal recognition of psychosocial studies as a distinct academic area.

In 2013, Frosh was an inaugural member of the Association for Psychosocial Studies, which helped to define the contours of the field. By the 2020s, psychosocial studies had expanded globally, with researchers from Latin America, South Africa, India and other regions contributing to its development. As evident in the range of contributions to The Palgrave Handbook of Psychosocial Studies, the field has grown significantly, moving beyond its origins in psychoanalysis and social work to embrace a range of critical academic traditions.

== Honours and awards ==
- British Psychological Society Award for Best Academic Monograph (2023) – Those Who Come After: Postmemory, Acknowledgement and Forgiveness (2019)
- Fellow of the Academy of Social Sciences
- Academic Associate, British Psychoanalytical Society
- Honorary Member, Institute of Group Analysis
- Founding Member, Association for Psychosocial Studies

== Selected publications ==
- Frosh, S. (1987). The Politics of Psychoanalysis: An Introduction to Freudian and Post-Freudian Theory. Yale University Press.
- Frosh, S. (1991). Identity Crisis: Modernity, Psychoanalysis and the Self. Macmillan.
- Frosh, S. (1997). For and Against Psychoanalysis. Routledge. (Revised edition, 2006)
- Frosh, S. (1999). The Politics of Psychoanalysis: An Introduction to Freudian and Post-Freudian Theory. Second edition. Palgrave Macmillan.
- Frosh, S. (2002). After Words: The Personal in Gender, Culture and Psychotherapy. Palgrave Macmillan.
- Frosh, S. (2005). Hate and the Jewish Science: Anti-Semitism, Nazism and Psychoanalysis. Palgrave Macmillan.
- Frosh, S. (2011). Feelings. Routledge.
- Frosh, S. (2010). Psychoanalysis Outside the Clinic: Interventions in Psychosocial Studies. Palgrave Macmillan.
- Frosh, S. (2013). Hauntings: Psychoanalysis and Ghostly Transmissions. Palgrave Macmillan.
- Frosh, S. (2019). Those Who Come After: Postmemory, Acknowledgement and Forgiveness. Palgrave Macmillan.
- Frosh, S. (2023). Antisemitism and Racism: Ethical Challenges for Psychoanalysis. Palgrave Macmillan.
- Frosh, S. (2025). How to be Real: A Survival Guide in Challenging Times. Verso.
