= Childhood and Society =

1950 book by Erik Erikson

- Cover of the first edition
- Author: Erik Erikson
- Language: English
- Subject: Childhood
- Publisher: W. W. Norton & Co
- Publication date: 1950
- Publication place: United States
- Media type: Print (Hardcover and Paperback)
- Pages: 445
- ISBN: 039331068X

Childhood and Society is a 1950 book about the social significance of childhood by the psychoanalyst Erik H. Erikson.

== Summary ==
Erikson discusses the social significance of childhood, introducing ideas such as the eight stages of psychosocial development and the concept of an "identity crisis".

== Reception ==
Childhood and Society was the first of Erikson's books to become popular. The critic Frederick Crews calls the work "a readable and important book extending Freud's developmental theory." The Oxford Handbook of Identity names Erikson as the seminal figure in "the developmental approach of understanding identity".
