= Kai T. Erikson =

American sociologist (1931–2025)

- Born: Kai Theodor Erikson; February 12, 1931; Vienna, Austria
- Died: November 10, 2025 (aged 94); Hamden, Connecticut, U.S.
- Education: University of Chicago; Reed College
- Occupation: Sociologist
- Parents: Erik Erikson (father); Joan Serson (mother)

Kai Theodor Erikson (February 12, 1931 – November 10, 2025) was an American sociologist, noted as an authority on the social consequences of catastrophic events. He served as the 76th president of the American Sociological Association.

== Life and career ==
Erikson was born in Vienna on February 12, 1931, the son of Joan Erikson (née Serson), a Canadian-born artist, dancer, and writer, and Erik Erikson, a German-born famed psychologist and sociologist. His maternal grandfather was an Episcopalian minister, and Erikson was raised a Protestant. Erikson graduated from The Putney School in Vermont, Reed College in Oregon and earned a PhD at the University of Chicago. He joined the faculty of the University of Pittsburgh in 1959 where he held a joint appointment at the School of Medicine and in the Department of Sociology. There he met his future wife Joanna Slivka, who became Joanna Erikson.

In 1963, he moved to Emory University and followed that with a move to Yale University in 1966. He later held the title of William R. Kenan, Jr. Professor Emeritus of Sociology and American Studies.

Erikson edited The Yale Review from 1979 to 1989. He died on November 10, 2025, at the age of 94.

== Wayward Puritans ==
Within his field of sociology, Erikson specialized in the sociology of deviance. In 1962 he contributed to the study with an article in Social Problems journal. He wrote, for a general audience, an expose of Puritan hypocrisy: Wayward Puritans is the title of his first book (1966), which contains a chapter on sociology of deviance and a chapter on the Massachusetts Bay Colony before three illustrations of deviance within the colony. The first was associated with Anne Hutchinson and Governor Vane and called the Antinomian Controversy. The second was concerned with an intrusion of Quakers, while the third was the Salem witch trials. The book notes the deviation from the City upon a Hill ideal set by John Winthrop.

H. Lawrence Ross described the book as "fascinating and superbly written". The sociological premise explored is from Émile Durkheim: "a function of deviance is to define the normative boundaries of the group." He notes that it is "a remarkable exception to the well-known tendency of sociological research to focus on the here and now." On the statistical analysis Ross comments: "the reasons to expect constancy of deviance over time, such as the limited capacity of the control system, would seem to predict stability of convictions as much as stability of offenders, and in consequence the analysis here seems unsatisfactory.”

== Aftermaths of disasters ==
Erikson subsequently studied a number of disasters in the context of their sociological implications, including the nuclear fallout in the Marshall Islands in 1954; the Buffalo Creek flood in West Virginia in 1972 (resulting in the award-winning 1978 book Everything in Its Path); the Three Mile Island nuclear accident in 1979; the Exxon Valdez oil spill in 1989; and the genocide in Yugoslavia of 1992 to 1995.

== Bibliography ==
- 1966: Wayward Puritans: A Study in the Sociology of Deviance ISBN 978-0205424030
- 1978: Everything in Its Path: Destruction of Community in the Buffalo Creek Flood, Simon & Schuster ISBN 9780671240677
- 1994: A New Species of Trouble: Explorations of Disaster, Trauma, and Community via Internet Archive
