= Sasha Roseneil =

English sociologist and group analyst (born 1966)

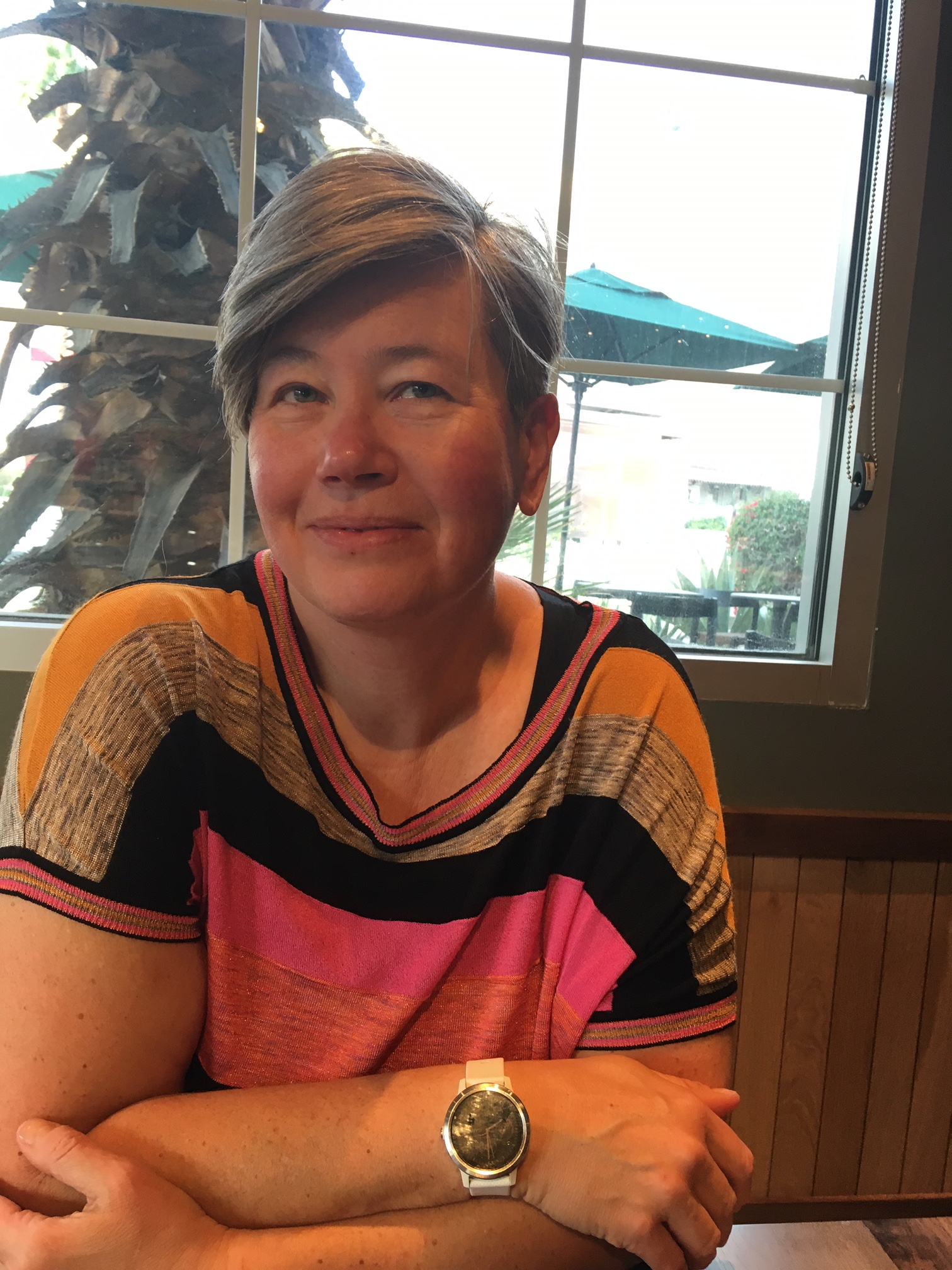
- Roseneil in 2018
- Born: 1966 (age 59–60)

Academic background
- Education: London School of Economics (BSc, MSc, PhD)
- Thesis: Feminist Political Action: The Case of the Greenham Common Women's Peace Camp (1994)

Academic work
- Discipline: Sociology
- Institutions: University College London; University of Essex
- Doctoral students: Sally Hines

Sasha Roseneil (born 1966) is a group analyst and a psychoanalytic psychotherapist. Roseneil became the ninth vice chancellor of the University of Sussex in August 2022.

== Early life and education ==
Roseneil obtained a 1st class BSc degree in economics (special subject sociology) from the London School of Economics, where she studied between 1985 and 1988, before undertaking a Ph.D. at the same institution. Roseneil's Ph.D. thesis is titled Feminist political action: the case of the Greenham Common Women's Peace Camp which she completed in 1994. Roseneil undertook postgraduate training in Group Analysis at the Turvey Institute for Group Analytic Psychotherapy, and received a postgraduate diploma in Group Analytic Psychotherapy from Oxford Brookes University and the Institute of Group Analysis.

== Career ==
From 1991 to 2007, Roseneil was a lecturer of sociology, a University Research Fellow and, from 2000, a professor of Sociology and Gender Studies at the University of Leeds. She was the founding director of the Centre for Interdisciplinary Gender Studies (1997–2004). From 2005 to 2015, Roseneil was visiting professor II in Sociology at the Centre for Gender Research at the University of Oslo. From 2007 to 2015, she was professor of Sociology and Social Theory in the Department of Psychosocial Studies at Birkbeck University, and director of the Birkbeck Institute for Social Research. Among her duties, she served as assistant dean (research) for the School of Social Science, History and Philosophy, and head of the Department of Psychosocial Studies.

In 2014, she held a position at the Institute of Advanced Studies, University of Western Australia as professor-at-large. Roseneil held the position of executive dean of the Faculty of Social Sciences and professor of sociology at the University of Essex from 2016 to 2018. During this period, more than 60 new academics were appointed whilst establishing a new Department of Psychosocial and Psychoanalytic Studies. Roseneil was appointed as dean of University College London (UCL) faculty of Social and Historical Sciences in March 2018. Roseneil is based in the UCL Institute of Advanced Studies. She became the vice-chancellor of the University of Sussex in August 2022.

In 2025, in response to a £585,000 fine imposed on the University of Sussex by the UK's Office for Students (OfS) for failing to protect freedom of speech, Roseneil released a statement arguing that the ruling was "a dangerous precedent and constitutes serious regulatory overreach in service of a politically motivated inquiry". The university announced that it would take legal action against the OfS through tribunal and seek a judicial review of the OfS's decision.

== Research ==
Roseneil's research spans sociology, gender studies, psychosocial studies and group analysis, and has focused on social movements, citizenship and gender politics, and on intimacy, sexuality and personal life. Her Ph.D. thesis studied the Greenham Common Women's Peace Camp and how women can act collectively for social change, and against male domination and female subordination. The Greenham Common Peace Camp was an example of a non-violent feminist protest, started by Welsh anti-nuclear feminist group Women for Life on Earth, and mobilising hundreds of thousands of women over more than a decade. In 2016, at an event Bringing Greenham Home, which featured a weekend of Greenham-related films, Roseneil spoke about her personal ties to Greenham Common and her perception of the peace camps as "queer, intersectional spaces, where both gender diversity and indigenous land rights were part of the discussion".

Roseneil has studied transformation in subjectivity, gender, sexuality, and personal life over time, focusing both on individual experience and the role of social movements and collective action in producing social change. Drawing on psychoanalysis, Roseneil is particularly interested in why there is individual or collective resistance, including unconscious resistance, to change.

Among Roseneil's studies are explorations into the experiences of people in non-conventional couples and families, including people who are in relationships in which they live apart from their partners, people in lesbian and gay relationships, those in shared accommodation, and single people. A common thread is an interest in friendship and how support and care can be provided through non-familial networks. Her research also encompasses members of marginalised and racialised groups, first/second generation migrants and exiled communities.

Roseneil uses a combination of biographical narrative, psychoanalytically informed methods, results from surveys and comparative national studies to gather single-person case studies alongside macro-level analysis. She has focused her research on people living in the United Kingdom and Bulgaria, Norway and Portugal.

One example of her work, in a study called Living Apart Together, relates to couples who choose to live separately. This report suggested that the number of couples who live apart in the United Kingdom may be higher than the 6% found in the 2011 census, a number that Roseneil claims is closer to 10% of the population. Nearly half are aged between 16 and 44. Reasons include the difficulty of finding jobs in the same location as more women now work, and women wanting respite from domestic chores traditionally expected in cohabiting. In earlier research on unconventional intimacies, Roseneil found that people were "enmeshed in complex networks of intimacy and care, and had strong commitments and connections to others" to whom they were not biologically or legally related.

In 2020, Roseneil published the open access book The Tenacity of the Couple-Norm: Intimate citizenship regimes in a changing Europe with Isabel Crowhurst, Tone Hellesund, Ana Cristina Santos and Mariya Stoilova.

== Books ==
Roseneil has published the following books:

- 2015: Reproducing Citizens: family, state and civil society (edited with Isabel Crowhurst, Ana Cristina Santos and Mariya Stoilova)
- 2013: Beyond Citizenship? Feminism and the Transformation of Belonging,
- 2012: Remaking Citizenship in Multicultural Europe: women’s movements, gender and diversity (edited with Beatrice Halsaa and Sevil Sümer).
- 2011: Social Research after the Cultural Turn, Basingstoke, (edited with Stephen Frosh).
- 2001: Globalisation and Social Movements, Basingstoke (edited with Pierre Hamel, Henri Lustiger-Thaler and Jan Nederveen Pieterse).
- 2000: Common Women, Uncommon Practices: the queer feminisms of Greenham,
- 1999: Consuming Cultures: power and resistance (edited with Jeff Hearn)
- 1999: Practising Identities: power and resistance, (edited with Julie Seymour).
- 1995: Disarming Patriarchy: feminism and political action at Greenham,
- 1994: Stirring It: challenges for feminism, (edited with Gabriele Griffin, Marianne Hester, Shirin Rai).

== Media appearances ==
Roseneil has appeared on numerous BBC affiliated broadcasts such as BBC Radio 4's Woman's Hour on episodes The Company of Women, Do Lesbians Really Want to Marry?, Peace Campaigners, and Part-time relationships. Roseneil has also guest-starred in the BBC Radio 4 series Thinking Allowed in a broadcast titled Living Apart Relationships and a BBC World Service broadcast titled Family Life.

In 2010, Roseneil appeared on the BBC 4 TV series Timeshift, in an episode titled Greenham Common Changed My Life.

In 2015, Roseneil was involved and interviewed in a film, The PhD Survival Video: PhDs, Stress and Mental Health which was launched at the Birkbeck Institute for Social Research. In an interview with Times Higher Education, Roseneil comments that problems are inherent in doing a PhD and can cause real stress:

“We talk about problems of isolation, competitiveness, the challenges to self-confidence that a PhD necessarily involves, and how, if you have particular vulnerabilities at the start, these can be accentuated during the PhD”

== Notable positions of responsibility ==
Roseneil served as the first chair of the Association for Psychosocial Studies until 2016. She is a member of the College of Psychoanalysis and Jungian Analysis of the United Kingdom Council for Psychotherapy and a full clinical member of the Institute of Group Analysis. She is on the council of the Academy of Social Sciences where she is also a fellow. Roseneil is a founding editor of the journal Feminist Theory and currently serves on the editorial board of the following academic journals:

- Social Movement Studies
- Nordic Journal of Feminist and Gender Research
- Women's Studies International Forum
- Amity: The Journal of Friendship Studies.
