= Sally Hines =

British sociologist and gender studies scholar

Professor Sally Hines
- Born: 28 July 1967 (age 58)
- Scientific career
- Institutions: University of Sheffield, University of Leeds
- Thesis: Transgender Identities, Intimate Relationships and Practices of Care (2004)
- Doctoral advisors: Fiona Williams, Sasha Roseneil

Sally Hines (born 28 July 1967) is a British sociologist and gender studies scholar. She is Professor of Sociology and Director of Equality, Diversity and Inclusion at the Department of Sociological Studies at the University of Sheffield. She is the daughter of Barry Hines, the novelist and screenwriter whose most famous book, A Kestrel for a Knave, was turned into the 1969 film Kes.

== Career ==
Hines earned a PhD in sociology at the University of Leeds in 2004 with the dissertation Transgender Identities, Intimate Relationships and Practices of Care, supervised by Fiona Williams and Sasha Roseneil.

She was Professor and Director of the Centre for Interdisciplinary Gender Studies at the University of Leeds until 2019, when she joined the University of Sheffield as Professor of Sociology.

Her research concerns gender, sexuality, intimacy and the body, feminist theory, intersectionality, and citizenship. She is the co-founder and co-chair, with Natacha Kennedy, of the Feminist Gender Equality Network, a group "dedicated to countering anti-trans propaganda at home and abroad."

According to Google Scholar her work has been cited over 3,000 times and she has an h-index of 28.

== Books ==
- Hines, Sally (2007). Transforming gender: transgender practices of identity, intimacy and care. Bristol, UK: The Policy Press. ISBN 9781861349170.
- Taylor, Yvette; Hines, Sally; Casey, Mark E., eds. (2010). Theorizing Intersectionality and Sexuality. Houndmills, Basingstoke, Hampshire; New York: Palgrave Macmillan. ISBN 9780230229303.
- Hines, Sally; Sanger, Tam, eds. (2010). Transgender identities: towards a social analysis of gender diversity. New York: Routledge. ISBN 978-0-415-99930-4.
- Hines, Sally; Taylor, Yvette, eds. (2012). Sexualities: past reflections, future directions. Basingstoke New York: Palgrave Macmillan. ISBN 9780230290099.
- Hines, Sally (2013). Gender diversity, recognition and citizenship: towards a politics of difference. Houndmills, Basingstoke New York: Palgrave Macmillan. ISBN 9781137318879.
- Hines, Sally (2018). Is gender fluid? a primer for the 21st century. London New York: Thames & Hudson. ISBN 9780500293683.

== Articles ==
- Hines, Sally (2005). ""I am a Feminist but …": Transgender Men, Women and Feminism". In Reger, Jo (ed.). Different wavelengths: studies of the contemporary women's movement. New York: Routledge. ISBN 9780415948784.
- Hines, Sally (2006). "What's the Difference?: Bringing Particularity to Queer Studies of Transgender". Journal of Gender Studies. 15 (1): 49–66.
- Hines, Sally (April 2006). "Intimate Transitions: Transgender Practices of Partnering and Parenting". Sociology. 40 (2): 353–371. doi:10.1177/0038038506062037.
- Hines, Sally (November 2007). "Transgendering care: Practices of care within transgender communities". Critical Social Policy. 27 (4): 462–486. doi:10.1177/0261018307081808.
- Hines, Sally (2010). "Sexing Gender; Gendering Sex: Towards an Intersectional Analysis of Transgender". In Taylor, Yvette; Hines, Sally; Casey, Mark E. (eds.). Theorizing Intersectionality and Sexuality. London: Palgrave MacMillan. pp. 140–162. ISBN 9780230229303.
- Hines, Sally (2012). "Stirring It Up – Again: A Politics of Difference in the New Millennium". In Hines, Sally; Taylor, Yvette (eds.). Sexualities, past reflections, future directions. Houndmills, Basingstoke, Hampshire; New York: Palgrave Macmillan. ISBN 9780230290099.
- Hines, Sally (1 May 2014). "Feminism". TSQ: Transgender Studies Quarterly. 1 (1–2): 84–86. doi:10.1215/23289252-2399677.
- Hines, Sally; Santos, Ana Cristina (February 2018). "Trans* policy, politics and research: The UK and Portugal". Critical Social Policy. 38 (1): 35–56. doi:10.1177/0261018317732880. hdl:10316/79667.
- Hines, Sally (2020). "Sex wars and (trans) gender panics: Identity and body politics in contemporary UK feminism". In Vincent, Ben; Erikainen, Sonja; Pearce, Ruth (eds.). TERF Wars: Feminism and the fight for transgender futures. Los Angeles: Sage Publishing. pp. 699–717. ISBN 9781529742909.
