= Association for Psychosocial Studies =

UK learned society

The Association for Psychosocial Studies (APS) is a learned society in the United Kingdom dedicated to promoting the academic discipline of psychosocial studies. The association publishes an academic journal, The Journal of Psychosocial Studies The Association for Psychosocial Studies was formed in 2013 in order to formalise and carry forward the work of developing Psychosocial Studies in the UK. The APS emerged from the Psychosocial Studies Network, which had organised annual conferences at the major university bases for Psychosocial Studies since 2008. The APS is a charitable trust and is recognised as a Learned Society by the Academy of Social Sciences.

== Founding members ==
Formed in 2013, the founding members of the association are: John Adlam, Phoebe Beedell, Tamara Bibby, Jo Brown, Rose Capdevila, Zoe Charalambous, Karen Ciclitira, Lita Crociani-Windland, Lynn Froggett, Stephen Frosh, Elizabeth Frost, Andi Fugard, Jason Glynos, Birgitta Haga Gripsrud, Rex Haigh, Ambrose Hogan, Paul Hoggett, Wendy Hollway, Shona Hunter, Rebecca Hutten, Luis Jiminez, David W. Jones, Warren Kinston, Helen Lucey, Jean McAvoy, James Martin, Claudia Megele, Yvonne Parry, Heather Price, Ellen Ramvi, Peter Redman, Barry Richards, Sasha Roseneil, Michael Rustin, Chris Scanlon, Gary Spencer-Humphrey, Paul Stenner, Jem Thomas, Isobel Urquhart, Julie Walsh, and Tom Wengraf.

== Steering committee ==
- Lynn Froggett, Chair (University of Central Lancashire)
- David W. Jones, Honorary Treasurer & Communications Officer (The Open University)
- Jacob Johanssen, Honorary Membership Secretary (St. Mary's University)
- Elizabeth Frost (University of West of England)
- Luis Jiminez (University of East London)
- Claudia Lapping (University College London)
- Chris Scanlon (Consultant Psychotherapist and Group Analyst)
- Candida Yates (Bournemouth University)
- Lita Crociani-Windland
- Nini Fang
- Anthony Faramelli

== Objectives ==
The APS objectives are:

- the advancement of education and research in the field of Psychosocial Studies, and publication of the results of such research,
- the promotion of the field of Psychosocial Studies as an academic discipline and the dissemination of knowledge concerning Psychosocial Studies,
- the advancement of education for the public benefit in Psychosocial Studies across different disciplines and educational sectors,
- to contribute to the advancement of public health and well-being, particularly in relation to mental health.

== Journal of Psychosocial Studies ==
According to the Aims and Scope of the journal, Psychosocial Studies draws on a range of disciplines to explore the interactive relationships between self, culture and society. While often focusing on affect and emotion, they explore the complexities of subjectivity and experience as it is lived and shaped in different contexts and settings. This approach is defined by a commitment to exploration of the links between the internal and external worlds; both the deeply personal and profoundly social.

The journal seeks to publish "papers that bring a psychosocial perspective that might help us understand a range of contemporary social phenomena. This might be work on family life, welfare practices, criminal justice issues, youth work or cultural products (such as film, art and literature).
