= Fiona Williams =

British professor (born 1947)

Fiona Williams OBE FBA FAcSS
- Born: Jonquil Fiona Williams; 22 July 1947 (age 79); Rugby, Warwickshire, England
- Children: 2

Academic background
- Education: Ilkley Grammar School
- Alma mater: Bedford College, London; Open University

Academic work
- Discipline: Social policy
- Sub-discipline: Gender; Race; Ethnicity; Welfare state
- Institutions: University of Ibadan; Kilburn Polytechnic; Polytechnic of North London; Plymouth Polytechnic; Leeds Polytechnic; Open University; University of Bradford; University of Leeds
- Doctoral students: Sally Hines

Jonquil Fiona Williams, OBE, FBA, FAcSS (born 22 July 1947) is a British retired academic of social policy whose research covers gender, race, ethnicity, and the welfare state. From 1996 to 2012, she was Professor of Social Policy at the University of Leeds. She was previously a lecturer at the Polytechnic of North London, Plymouth Polytechnic, and the Open University, before becoming Professor of Applied Social Studies at the University of Bradford.

== Early life and education ==
Williams was born on 22 July 1947 in Rugby, Warwickshire, England, to Celia and Leonard Williams. She was educated at Ilkley Grammar School, a state grammar school in Ilkley, Yorkshire. She studied sociology and social administration at Bedford College, London, graduating with a Bachelor of Science (BSc) degree in 1968. In later life, she studied for a Doctor of Philosophy (PhD) degree with the Open University, which she completed in 1993.

== Academic career ==
From 1968 to 1970, Williams was a Commonwealth Scholar at the University of Ibadan in Nigeria. Having returned to the United Kingdom, she was a part-time lecturer at Kilburn Polytechnic from 1970 to 1972 and a lecturer at the Polytechnic of North London from 1972 to 1975. After a break from academia, she joined Plymouth Polytechnic where she was a part-time lecturer between 1981 and 1985, and a research officer from 1985 to 1987. She was a research officer at Leeds Polytechnic during the 1987/1988 academic year.

In 1988, Williams joined the Open University; she was a lecturer from 1988 to 1992 and a senior lecturer from 1992 to 1995. For the 1995/1996 academic year, she was Professor of Applied Social Studies at the University of Bradford. In 1996, she joined the University of Leeds having been appointed Professor of Social Policy and remained there until she retired. She was Director of the Economic and Social Research Council (ESRC) Research Group on "Care, Values and the Future of Welfare" between 1999 and 2005. In 2012, she retired from full-time academia and was appointed a professor emeritus.

Williams has led an active retirement. Since 2012, she has been a research associate of the Centre on Migration, Policy and Society at the University of Oxford, She continued to be co-editor of the academic journal Social Politics: International Studies in Gender, State and Society until 2014. Since 2014, she has been an honorary professor of the Social Policy Research Centre, University of New South Wales.

== Personal life ==
Williams has two children: a daughter and a son.

== Honours ==
In 2003, Williams was elected a Fellow of the Academy of Social Sciences (FAcSS). In the 2004 New Year Honours, she was appointed an Officer of the Order of the British Empire (OBE) "for services to social policy". In 2016, she was elected a Fellow of the British Academy (FBA), the United Kingdom's national academy for the humanities and social sciences.

== Selected works ==
- Williams, Fiona (1989). Social policy: a critical introduction – issues of race, gender, and class. Cambridge: Polity Press. ISBN 978-0745601496.
- Atkinson, Dorothy; Williams, Fiona, eds. (1990). 'Know me as I am': an anthology of prose, poetry and art from people with learning disabilities. Hodder Education. ISBN 978-0340513293.
- Bornat, Joanna; Johnson, Julia; Pereira, Charmaine; Tomasini, Floris; Williams, Fiona, eds. (1992). Community Care: Reader (1st ed.). Houndmills: Macmillan. ISBN 978-0333587157.
- Bornat, Joanna; Johnson, Julia; Pereira, Charmaine; Tomasini, Floris; Williams, Fiona, eds. (1998). Community care: a reader (2nd ed.). Basingstoke: Macmillan. ISBN 978-0333698471.
- Williams, Fiona; Popay, Jennie; Oakley, Ann, eds. (1999). Welfare Research: a critical review. London: UCL Press. ISBN 978-1857282696.
- Williams, Fiona (2004). Rethinking families. London: Calouste Gulbenkian Foundation. ISBN 978-1903080023.
