= Joan Erikson =

Canadian psychologist

- Born: Sarah Lucretia Serson; June 27, 1903; Brockville, Ontario, Canada
- Died: August 3, 1997 (aged 94); Brewster, Massachusetts
- Occupations: Collaborator with her husband, Erik Erikson, author, educator, craftsperson, weaver, jeweler, beadwork, dance ethnographer
- Known for: Helped reshape the prevailing psychological view of human development
- Spouse: Erik Erikson (m. 1930; died 1994)
- Children: Kai T. Erikson; Jon Erikson; Sue Erikson Bloland; Neil Erikson

Joan Mowat Erikson (born Sarah Lucretia Serson; June 27, 1903 – August 3, 1997) was a Canadian author, educator, craftsperson, and dance ethnographer. She was well known as a collaborator with her husband, Erik Erikson.

== Early life ==
Joan Erikson was born in Brockville, Ontario, one of three children of John Reaby and Mary Louise MacDonald Serson. Her father (who died when she was six) and her brother were priests ordained in the Anglican Church of Canada. Her birth name was Sarah Lucretia Serson. She later changed her name to Sarah Mowat Serson, then to Sally Mowat Serson, then to Joan Mowat Serson. When she married Erik she became Joan Mowat Homburger, and, in 1939, became Joan Mowat Erikson when she and Erik were naturalized as U.S. citizens "using the self-invented name Erikson."

=== Moves to Vienna and the United States ===
Joan moved to Vienna to conduct dance research for her doctoral dissertation and there met her husband-to-be Erik Homburger, who was working at a progressive school started by Anna Freud. Joan and Erik married in 1930. Joan persuaded Erik to move to the United States three years later ("to escape European fascism"), where they became citizens in 1939. The Eriksons spent time at Harvard and Yale Universities, and then moved to the University of California at Berkeley.

The Eriksons' daughter, Sue Erikson Bloland, says that, in the eyes of her father, her mother was "the ultimate source of strength and wisdom within the family (if not the universe), the real healer, the solver of all problems both practical and personal. Judith Wallerstein, a longtime friend, said that "to her husband, Joan was always bigger than life. Far beyond the lovely and loving woman he married, she represented to him all women–the very essence of the feminine ideals of beauty, compassion, nurturance, and strength."

In 1944, Joan gave birth to a fourth child, Neil, who was born with Down's Syndrome and was immediately institutionalized.

== Death ==
Joan died on August 3, 1997, in a nursing home in Brewster, Massachusetts, three years after the death of her husband, Erik. Mrs. Erikson's survivors included two sons, Kai of Hamden, Conn., and Jon of Port Angeles, Wash.; a daughter, Sue Bloland of Manhattan, and three grandchildren.

== Education and professional accomplishments ==
Joan obtained an undergraduate degree from Barnard College and a master's from Teachers College, Columbia University. She completed doctorate course work before moving to Europe to conduct research for a dance dissertation. She spent time observing dance schools and teaching dance to children in Austria and Germany. After meeting husband Erik Erikson, Joan stopped research for her dissertation and took a job at the progressive school in Vienna, where he was working. She believed that children should be taught based on their interests, and structured lessons accordingly. She taught English to many of the psychoanalysts at the school, including her husband.

During their time spent at the University of California at Berkeley, the Eriksons created the eight cycles of psychosocial development and Joan began her interest in arts and crafts, crucial to her later work in art therapy. In 1951, Joan became the director of activities at the Austen Riggs Center, a psychiatric treatment facility for children and adults in Stockbridge, Massachusetts. She created the Theatre Program and the Montessori Nursery School there.

Joan and Erik later returned to Harvard, where they taught classes together at the Joan and Erik Erikson Center. In the 1970s, Joan continued her art therapy work with adolescents at Mt. Zion Hospital in San Francisco. She wrote several books, including The Universal Bead; Activity, Recovery, and Growth; and Wisdom and the Senses.

== Psychosocial development ==
Joan Erikson was the main collaborator in developing the eight stages of psychosocial development with her husband Erik Erikson. Despite often being overlooked, her contributions were crucial: Erik admitted being unable to distinguish between his own contribution and his wife's. Joan had a great influence on the development of the stages and on the inclusion of the eighth stage.

Erikson's Eight Stages of Psychosocial Development
	Crisis	Virtue
Infancy	Trust vs Mistrust	Hope
Toddlerhood	Autonomy vs Shame	Will
Preschool	Initiative vs Guilt	Purpose
Childhood	Industry vs Inferiority	Competence
Adolescence	Identity vs Role Confusion	Fidelity
Young Adulthood	Intimacy vs Isolation	Love
Middle Adulthood	Generativity vs Stagnation	Care
Late Adulthood	Integrity vs Despair	Wisdom

The pair created the stages as they were experiencing them themselves, and after Erik's death in 1994, Joan added a ninth stage of very old age. This ninth stage is experienced in the eighties and nineties and is accompanied by a loss of physical health, friends, family members, and independence, in addition to isolation from society. During the ninth stage, the crisis points of the previous stages are confronted again. For example, elderly adults confronting increasing physical and mental declines may lose trust in their own ability to care for themselves. They are facing a crisis similar to the trust vs. mistrust experienced in stage one.

Joan Erikson believed that during the ninth stage, older adults can shift towards a more transcendent perspective, which increases life satisfaction. She describes transcendence as regaining skills such as play, activity, and song. Most importantly, it means moving beyond fear of death.

Often during this time, individuals are put into retirement communities and assisted living facilities, which Joan believed was isolating them from society and from youth. She believed that "aging is a process of becoming free" and should not be treated as the opposite. As a result of these changes, individuals experience a loss of autonomy, self-esteem, and trust. Death is near and seen as an inevitable reality. Joan contributed to the writings on the first eight stages in the book, The Life Cycle Completed, and later added the final part on the ninth stage.

Research has been done that supports Erikson’s stages. In particular, the work of James E. Marcia on adolescence and identity supports Erikson’s crisis of adolescence. Criticism of their psychosocial development theory includes that it focuses on the development of American men and excludes other groups.

== Art therapy ==
Joan Erikson believed that the arts possess their own healing properties and can be used as an exclusive form of therapy. She believed that people's artwork should not be psychoanalyzed or interpreted but should be used solely for healing through creative process. She came into conflict with Anna Freud over this issue while working at the school in Vienna, stating that children's creativity should not be psychoanalyzed.

Joan created the Activities Program at the Austin Riggs Center in Massachusetts, which included a theatre program and other artistic outlets for patients. There, Joan worked with Ellen Kivnick to determine which types of creative practices led to improved psychological development in children and youth. They thought that using materials that can change shape could change the shape of a child's psyche. Joan encouraged artwork to be its own form of healing and to help patients learn new skills, instead of focusing on an absence of skills or abilities. Her relationship with patients was not one of a therapist to patient, but one between artists.

== Importance of play ==
Joan Erikson was an advocate of play throughout life, which she defined as something to do "for your own pleasure because you find it amusing and enhancing somehow." (page 2) Play can be anything from art, to sports, to conversation. Joan thought that adults spend too much time doing what they think they are supposed to be doing, and not taking time to do what they enjoy. She related play and humor, and believed that without a sense of humor, people lose freedom and the ability to play.

Play is important during for people in all stages of life, including older adults. Older adults have identified physical, cognitive, emotional, and social benefits from play. Joan Erikson thought it was especially important for older adults facing retirement to engage in creative activities. Retirement can be a major adjustment for some older adults, particularly if work has become a large part of how they identify themselves.

== Bibliography ==
- Wisdom and the Senses: The Way of Creativity (1988)
- Activity, Recovery, Growth: The Communal Role of Planned Activities (1978)
- "The Arts as Healing" in American Journal of Orthopsychiatry (with H. Kivnick, 1983)
- Vital Involvement in Old Age (with E.H. Erikson and H. Kivnick, 1986)
- Life Cycle Completed: Extended Version (with E.H. Erikson, 1997)
- The Universal Bead (1993)
- Saint Francis and His Four Ladies (1970)
- Legacies (1993)

== See also ==
- Erikson's stages of psychosocial development
- In the Shadow of Fame: A Memoir by the Daughter of Erik Erikson (Viking, 2004)
