= Erikson's stages of psychosocial development =

Eight-stage model of psychoanalytic development

Erikson's stages of psychosocial development is a developmental theory proposed by psychoanalyst Erik Erikson that describes how individuals build their sense of identity and psychological well-being through social experiences across lifespans. This theory was first introduced in the 20th century, the theory expresses eight stages of development, each characterized by positive and negative experiences that influences an individual's physical and mental wellbeing. Erikson believed that the way individuals interacted with society and navigate through these conflicts contribute to personality development, as well as, move them onto the next stage.

Erikson's theory bounced off of psychoanalyst Sigmund Freud, but expanded beyond his ideas to focus on childhood and how development is the influence of cultural, social and historical experiences throughout one's life. The 1950 book Childhood and Society presents the framework of the eight stages of psychosocial stages. Erikson's approach did not only emphasize the development of adolescence but adulthood and old age.

The eight stages of presented by Erikson range from trust versus mistrust in infancy to questioning the integrity and despair in adulthood. Each stage reflects a developmental conflict and a psychosocial strength such as autonomy, identity, love, wisdom to describe the social interaction. Joan Erikson, Erikson's wife contributed to the ninth stage through her own research and added to his book The Life Cycle Completed: Extended Version (1998).

The theory contributed to the research in developmental psychology, identity formation, education, counseling, gerontology and other influences. Although, the theory has cultural criticisms/ assumptions there is a lack of evidence to support proposed stages and the age range assigned to each stage. Modern research is needed to allow researchers to explore and build on Erikson's ideas.

== Development of post-Freudian theory ==
Erikson was a student of Anna Freud, renowned child-analyst, teacher, and daughter of Sigmund Freud, whose psychoanalytic theory and psychosexual stages contributed to the basic outline of the eight stages, at least those concerned with childhood. Namely, the first four of Erikson's life stages correspond to Freud's oral, anal, phallic, and latency phases, respectively. Also, the fifth stage of adolescence is said to parallel the genital stage in psychosexual development:

Although the first three phases are linked to those of the Freudian theory, it can be seen that they are conceived along very different lines. Emphasis is not so much on sexual modes and their consequences, but on the ego qualities which emerge from each of the stages. There is an attempt also to link the sequence of individual development to the broader context of society.

Erikson saw a dynamic at work throughout life, one that did not stop at adolescence. He also viewed the life stages as a cycle: the end of one generation was the beginning of the next. Seen in its social context, the life stages were linear for an individual but circular for societal development:

In Freud's view, development is largely complete by adolescence. In contrast, one of Freud's students, Erik Erikson (1902–1994) believed that development continues throughout life. Erikson took the foundation laid by Freud and extended it through adulthood and into late life.

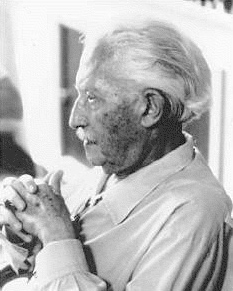
Erik Erikson

== Development of psychosocial stages ==
As articulated in the second half of the 20th century by Erik Erikson in collaboration with his wife Joan Erikson, is a comprehensive psychoanalytic theory that identifies a series of eight stages that a healthy developing individual should pass through from infancy to late adulthood.

According to Erikson's theory the results from each stage, whether positive or negative, influence the results of succeeding stages. Erikson published a book called Childhood and Society in 1950 that highlighted his research on the eight stages of psychosocial development. Erikson was originally influenced by Sigmund Freud's psychosexual stages of development. He began by working with Freud's theories specifically, but as he began to dive deeper into biopsychosocial development and how other environmental factors affect human development, he soon progressed past Freud's theories and developed his own ideas. Erikson developed different substantial ways to create a theory about lifespan he theorized about the nature of personality development as it unfolds from birth through old age or death. He argued that the social experience was valuable throughout our life to each stage that can be recognizable by a conflict specifically as we encounter between the psychological needs and the surroundings of the social environment.

Erikson's stage theory characterizes an individual advancing through the eight life stages as a function of negotiating their biological and sociocultural forces. The two conflicting forces each have a psychosocial crisis which characterizes the eight stages. If an individual does indeed successfully reconcile these forces (favoring the first mentioned attribute in the crisis), they emerge from the stage with the corresponding virtue. For example, if an infant enters into the toddler stage (autonomy vs. shame and doubt) with more trust than mistrust, they carry the virtue of hope into the remaining life stages. Erikson wanted these stages to be like toy building blocks, meaning that the stages are meant to be built on top of each other. The stage challenges that are not successfully overcome may be expected to return as problems in the future. However, mastery of a stage is not required to advance to the next stage. In one study, subjects showed significant development as a result of organized activities.

Erikson's research was heavily influenced by his experiences as someone born in Germany to a Jewish mother and with multiple father figures, as he never knew his biological father growing up. He felt as though he didn't belong in German nor Jewish communities. Feeling estranged, he felt conflicted about his identity, which would later become the core of his stage theory. After fleeing from Germany during Hitler's fascist regime, he became a witness to prejudice and nationalism and how people developed under oppression. The development of identity under the influence of oppression and prejudice was also an influence on his research.

== Stages ==
=== Hope: trust vs. mistrust (oral-sensory, infancy, under 1 year) ===
- Existential Question: Can I Trust the World?

The first stage of Erik Erikson's theory centers around the infant's basic needs being met by the parents or caregiver and how this interaction leads to trust or mistrust. Trust as defined by Erikson is "an essential trustfulness of others as well as a fundamental sense of one's own trustworthiness." The infant depends on the parents, especially the mother, for sustenance and comfort. Infants will often use methods such as pointing to indicate their interests or desires to their parents or caregivers. The child's relative understanding of the world and society comes from the parents and their interaction with the child. Children first learn to trust their parents or a caregiver. If the parents expose their child to warmth, security, and dependable affection, the infant's view of the world will be one of trust. As the child learns to trust the world around them, they also acquire the virtue of hope. Should parents fail to provide a secure environment and to meet the child's basic needs; a sense of mistrust will result. Development of mistrust can later lead to feelings of frustration, suspicion, withdrawal, and a lack of confidence.

According to Erik Erikson, the major developmental task in infancy is to learn whether or not other people, especially primary caregivers, regularly satisfy basic needs. If caregivers are consistent sources of food, comfort, and affection, an infant learns trust — that others are dependable and reliable. If they are neglectful, or perhaps even abusive, the infant instead learns mistrust — that the world is an undependable, unpredictable, and possibly a dangerous place. Having some experience with mistrust allows the infant to gain an understanding of what constitutes dangerous situations later in life. However, infants and toddlers should not be subjected to prolonged situations of mistrust. This causes children to be ill adjusted later in life and see life with a cautious and careful outlook, which can be detrimental later in their life. In this stage, the child's most important needs are to feel safe, comforted, and well cared for.

=== Will: autonomy vs. shame/doubt (muscular, toddlerhood, 1–2 years) ===
- Existential Question: Is It Okay to Be Me?

As the child gains control over eliminative functions and motor abilities, they begin to explore their surroundings. Parents still provide a strong base of security from which the child can venture out to assert their will. The parents' patience and encouragement help to foster autonomy in the child. During early childhood, the child will start to have learning tasks and skills that instill personal responsibility, which allows the children to make choices that could help them develop a sense of autonomy and confidence. Children at this age like to explore the world around them and they are constantly learning about their environment. Caution must be taken at this age while children may explore things that are dangerous to their health and safety.

If caregivers encourage self-sufficient behavior, toddlers will develop a sense of autonomy—a sense of being able to handle many problems on their own. On the contrary, there is the possibility that the caregiver can demand too much too soon. This will likely lead the child to develop shame and doubt in their ability to handle problems. This shame and doubt could also come as a result of a caregiver ridiculing a child's early performance attempts. There is definitely a delicate balance to be had with autonomy. If the child receives too much autonomy, they have the potential to grow up with little concern for rules or regulations. This could also increase the likelihood of injury. Conversely, if the parents exert too much control over them, the child can grow up to be more rebellious and impulsive. The abilities of the child are limited.

Both approaches to this stage have their strengths and weaknesses to them. The best way to help the child is to use a combination of both of them that allows the child to explore while knowing what is dangerous to him/her.

=== Purpose: initiative vs. guilt (locomotor-genital, play age, 3–6 years) ===
- Existential Question: Is it Okay for Me to Do, Move, and Act?

Initiative adds to autonomy the quality of planning, undertaking, and attacking a task for the sake of just being active and in motion. During this stage, the child is learning to master the surrounding world, learning basic skills, and developing an intuitive understanding of physical principles. The child seeks to begin and complete their own actions for a purpose. Guilt emerges as a confusing new emotion. Children may experience guilt over things that logically should not cause guilt. They may also feel guilty when their initiative does not produce desired results.

The development of courage and independence are what set preschoolers, ages three to six years of age, apart from other age groups. Young children in this category face the psychological crisis of initiative versus guilt. This includes learning how to face complexities of planning and developing a sense of judgment. During this stage, the child learns to take initiative and prepares for leadership roles, and to achieve goals. Activities sought out by a child in this stage may include risk-taking behaviors, such as crossing a street alone or riding a bike without a helmet; both these examples involve self-limits. The child may also develop negative behaviors as they learn to take initiative. These negative behaviors, such as throwing objects, hitting, or yelling, can be a result of the child feeling frustrated after not being able to achieve a goal as planned.

=== Competence: industry vs. inferiority (latency, late childhood, 7–10 years) ===
- Existential Question: Can I Make it in the World of People and Things?

The aim of this stage is to bring a productive situation to completion which gradually supersedes the whims and wishes of play. The fundamentals of technology are developed. The failure to master trust, autonomy, and industrious skills may cause the child to doubt their future, leading to shame, guilt, and the experience of defeat and inferiority.

"Children at this age are becoming more aware of themselves as individuals." They work hard at "being responsible, being good and doing it right." They are now more reasonable to share and cooperate. Allen and Marotz (2003) also list some perceptual cognitive developmental traits specific for this age group. Children grasp the concepts of space and time in more logical, practical ways. They gain a better understanding of cause and effect, and of calendar time. They also get to form moral values, recognize cultural and individual differences and are able to manage most of their personal needs and grooming with minimal assistance. At this stage, children might express their independence by talking back and being disobedient and rebellious.

Erikson viewed the elementary school years as critical for the development of self-confidence. Ideally, elementary school provides many opportunities to achieve the recognition of teachers, parents and peers by producing things—drawing pictures, solving addition problems, writing sentences, and so on. If children are encouraged to make and do things and are then praised for their accomplishments, they begin to demonstrate industry by being diligent, persevering at tasks until completed, and putting work before pleasure. If children are instead ridiculed or punished for their efforts or if they find they are incapable of meeting their teachers' and parents' expectations, they develop feelings of inferiority about their capabilities.

=== Fidelity: identity vs. role confusion (adolescence, 11–19 years) ===
- Existential Question: Who Am I and What Can I Be?

The adolescent is newly concerned with how they appear to others. Superego identity is the accrued confidence that the outer sameness and continuity prepared in the future are matched by the sameness and continuity of one's meaning for oneself, as evidenced in the promise of a career. The ability to settle on a school or occupational identity is pleasant. Adolescents become curious about the roles they will play in the adult world as they transition from childhood to adulthood. Initially, they are apt to experience some role confusion—mixed ideas and feelings about the specific ways in which they will fit into society—and may experiment with a variety of behaviors and activities (e.g. tinkering with cars, baby-sitting for neighbors, affiliating with certain political or religious groups). Eventually, Erikson proposed, most adolescents achieve a sense of identity regarding who they are and where their lives are headed.

Erikson is credited with coining the term "identity crisis". He describes identity crisis as a critical part of development in which an adolescent or youth develops a sense of self. Identity crisis involves the integration of the physical self, personality, potential roles and occupations. It is influenced by culture and historical trends. For example, This stage is necessary for the successful development of future stages. Each stage that came before and that follows has its own 'crisis', but even more so now, for this marks the transition from childhood to adulthood. This passage is necessary because "Throughout infancy and childhood, a person forms many identifications. But the need for identity in youth is not met by these." This turning point in human development seems to be the reconciliation between 'the person one has come to be' and 'the person society expects one to become'. This emerging sense of self will be established by 'forging' past experiences with anticipations of the future. In relation to the eight life stages as a whole, the fifth stage corresponds to the crossroads:

=== Love: intimacy vs. isolation (early adulthood, 20–44 years) ===
- Existential Question: Can I Love?

The Intimacy versus Isolation conflict occurs following adolescence. At the start of this stage, identity versus role confusion is coming to an end, although it still lingers at the foundation of the stage. The stage doesn't always involve a romantic relationship but includes the strong bonds with others being formed. Young adults are still eager to blend their identities with those of their friends because they want to fit in. Erikson believes that people are sometimes isolated due to intimacy. People are afraid of rejections such as being turned down or their partners breaking up with them. Human beings are familiar with pain, and to some people, rejection is so painful that their egos cannot bear it. Erikson also argues that distantiation occurs with intimacy. Distantiation is the desire to isolate or destroy things that may be dangerous to one's own ideals or life. This can occur if a person has their intimate relationship invaded by outsiders.

Once people have established their identities, they are ready to make long-term commitments to others. They become capable of forming intimate, reciprocal relationships (e.g. through close friendships or marriage) and willingly make the sacrifices and compromises that such relationships require. Those in more advanced stages of identity development are often associated with greater success pertaining to intimacy formation. If people cannot form these intimate relationships—perhaps because of their own needs—then a sense of isolation may result, thereby arousing feelings of darkness and angst.

=== Care: generativity vs. stagnation (middle adulthood, 45–64 years) ===
- Existential Question: Can I Make My Life Count?

Generativity is the concern of guiding the next generation. Socially-valued work and disciplines are expressions of generativity.

The adult stage of generativity has broad application to family, relationships, work, and society. "Generativity, then is primarily the concern in establishing and guiding the next generation... the concept is meant to include... productivity and creativity."

During middle age, the primary developmental task is one of contributing to society and helping to guide future generations. When a person makes a contribution during this period, perhaps by raising a family or working toward the betterment of society, a sense of generativity—a sense of productivity and accomplishment—results. In contrast, a person who is self-centered and unable or unwilling to help society move forward develops a feeling of stagnation—a dissatisfaction with the relative lack of productivity. People in this stage consider what they are leaving behind for their posterity and community, as they are coming closer to the end of their life. The virtue that is related with this stage is care.

=== Wisdom: ego integrity vs. despair (late adulthood, 65 years and above) ===
- Existential Question: Is it Okay to Have Been Me?

It is during this time that they contemplate their accomplishments and evaluate the person that they have become. They begin to embrace their narrative about their lives.They are able to develop integrity if they see themselves as leading a successful life. Those who have developed integrity perceive that their lives have meaning. They tend to feel generally satisfied and accept themselves and others. As they near the end of their lives, they are more likely to be at peace about death. If they see their life as unproductive or feel that they did not accomplish their life goals, they become dissatisfied with life and develop despair. This can often lead to feelings of depression and hopelessness. When a person feels this way about life it usually can be traced back to the unsuccessful completion of one of Erikson's stages during their life. They may also feel that life is unfair and be fearful of dying.

As people grow older and become senior citizens, they tend to slow down their productivity and explore life as a retired person. Factors such as leisure activities and family involvement play a significant role in the life of a retiree and their adjustment to living without having to perform specific duties each day pertaining to their career. Even during this stage of adulthood, however, they are still developing. The association between aging and retirement can bring about a reappearance of bipolar tensions of earlier stages in Erikson's model, meaning that aspects of previous life stages can reactivate because of the onset of aging and retirement. Development at this stage also includes periods of reevaluation regarding life satisfaction, sustainment of active involvement, and developing a sense of health maintenance. Developmental conflicts may arise in this stage, but psychological growth in earlier stages can help significantly in resolving these conflicts.

=== Ninth stage ===
Joan Erikson, who married and collaborated with Erik Erikson, added a ninth stage in The Life Cycle Completed: Extended Version. Joan's research throughout her life focused heavily on the elderly and later stages of life. Living in the ninth stage, she wrote, "old age in one's eighties and nineties brings with it new demands, reevaluations, and daily difficulties". Addressing these new challenges requires "designating a new ninth stage". Erikson was ninety-three years old when she wrote about the ninth stage.

Joan Erikson showed that all the eight stages "are relevant and recurring in the ninth stage". In the ninth stage, the psychosocial crises of the eight stages are faced again, but with the quotient order reversed. For example, in the first stage (infancy), the psychosocial crisis was "Trust vs. Mistrust" with Trust being the "syntonic quotient" and Mistrust being the "dystonic". Joan Erikson applies the earlier psychosocial crises to the ninth stage as follows:

"Basic Mistrust vs. Trust: Hope"
In the ninth stage, "elders are forced to mistrust their own capabilities" because one's "body inevitably weakens". Yet, Joan Erikson asserts that "while there is light, there is hope" for a "bright light and revelation".

"Shame and Doubt vs. Autonomy: Will"
Ninth stage elders face the "shame of lost control" and doubt "their autonomy over their own bodies". So it is that "shame and doubt challenge cherished autonomy".

"Inferiority vs. Industry: Competence"
Industry as a "driving force" that elders once had is gone in the ninth stage. Being incompetent "because of aging is belittling" and makes elders "like unhappy small children of great age".

"Identity confusion vs. Identity: Fidelity"
Elders experience confusion about their "existential identity" in the ninth stage and "a real uncertainty about status and role".

"Isolation vs. Intimacy: Love"
In the ninth stage, the "years of intimacy and love" are often replaced by "isolation and deprivation".

"Stagnation vs. Generativity: Care"
The generativity in the seventh stage of "work and family relationships", if it goes satisfactorily, is "a wonderful time to be alive". In one's eighties and nineties, there is less energy for generativity or caretaking. Thus, "a sense of stagnation may well take over".

"Despair and Disgust vs. Integrity: Wisdom"
Integrity imposes "a serious demand on the senses of elders". Wisdom requires capacities that ninth stage elders "do not usually have". The eighth stage includes retrospection that can evoke a "degree of disgust and despair". In the ninth stage, introspection is replaced by the attention demanded to one's "loss of capacities and disintegration".

Approximate age	Virtues	Psychosocial crisis	Significant relationship	Existential question	Events
Infancy Under 1 year	Hope	Trust vs. mistrust	Mother	Can I trust the world?	Feeding, abandonment
Toddlerhood 1–2 years	Will	Autonomy vs. shame/doubt	Parents	Is it okay to be me?	Toilet training, clothing themselves
Early childhood 3–6 years	Purpose	Initiative vs. guilt	Family	Is it okay for me to do, move, and act?	Exploring, using tools or making art
Late childhood 7–10 years	Competence	Industry vs. inferiority	Neighbors, school	Can I make it in the world of people and things?	School, sports
Adolescence 11–19 years	Fidelity	Identity vs. role confusion	Peers, role model	Who am I? Who can I be?	Social relationships
Early adulthood 20–44 years	Love	Intimacy vs. isolation	Friends, partners	Can I unite myself with another person?	Romantic relationships
Middle adulthood 45–64 years	Care	Generativity vs. stagnation	Household, workmates	Can I make my life count?	Work, parenthood
Late adulthood 65 and above	Wisdom	Ego integrity vs. despair	Humankind, my kind	Is it okay to have been me?	Reflection on life

== Modern influence ==
Erikson's work has been largely influential in the field of gerontology and has changed the way science understands and how society views older individuals. Prior to Erikson's research, aging was strictly viewed as a psychological decline. With his research, aging was viewed more positively, as Erikson's theory suggested that psychological development continues throughout the entire lifespan, including elder stages. His final stage, integrity vs. despair, framed the later stages of life as a time for positive reflection. Erikson's theory also influenced research in counseling, education, identity, lifespan development, and aging.

Psychoanalysis as a field has benefitted from Erikson's research on identity development. Erikson's work included an intersectional approach between social, cultural, and historical influences, which allowed psychoanalysts to expand their research beyond purely psychological influences. Erikson also influenced ego psychology by insinuating that the ego was active, adaptive, and shaped by social context instead of being purely motivated by unconscious drives.

Erikson's work has also been important in clinical contexts. Studying Erikson's stages of psychosocial development has been helpful for understanding stages of mental illness recovery. Additionally, a psychological inventory known as the Erikson Psychosocial Stage Inventory based on Erikson's stages has been made for evaluating psychosocial development. Finally, a model of psychodynamic psychotherapy was influenced by Erikson's stages of psychosocial development.

== Cross-Cultural Research ==
For a researcher in the 1930s, Erikson's work was quite progressive. In addition to being a witness to antisemitic discrimination, Erikson also did research on Native Americans and Black Americans. He conducted fieldwork with two Native American tribes, the Oglala Lakota and the Yurok tribes. Through his research, he studied child-rearing and identity formation. He was able to recognize that Native Americans struggled with identity as a result of discrimination and colonization. His research with Native Americans and how they adapted to colonization heavily influenced his work with identity formation.

When researching Black Americans, he chose to focus on Black experiences during segregation and how their identity would be affected. He wrote about internalized racism and how identity became a struggle for Black Americans, with Erikson believing that segregation played a major role in how Black Americans understood their own identity. Though this work was progressive, it was minimal compared to his work with non-minority groups. Erikson later admitted he lacked knowledge about how Black people lived and that theory wouldn't be able to explain their experiences alone.

== Criticism ==
One major criticism of Erikson's theory of psychosocial development is that it primarily describes the development of European or American males. Erikson's theory may be questioned as to whether his stages must be regarded as sequential, and only occurring within the age ranges he suggests. There is debate as to whether people only search for identity during the adolescent years or if one stage needs to happen before other stages can be completed. However, Erikson states that each of these processes occurs throughout the lifetime in one form or another, and he emphasizes these "phases" only because it is at these times that the conflicts become most prominent.

Most empirical research into Erikson has related to his views on adolescence and attempts to establish identity. His theoretical approach was studied and supported, particularly regarding adolescence, by James E. Marcia. Marcia's work has distinguished different forms of identity, and there is some empirical evidence that those people who form the most coherent self-concept in adolescence are those who are most able to make intimate attachments in early adulthood. This supports the part of Erikson theory, that suggests that those best equipped to resolve the crisis of early adulthood are those who have most successfully resolved the crisis of adolescence.

Erikson attributed the development of the stages to the presence of specific tensions which may be present at any moment of a person's life. This causes another criticism of Erikson's theory of psychosocial development: that Erikson does not go into detail about what causes these stages of development or how they are resolved. There is little information stated about the experiences that result in how a person develops at each stage. Just as there are vague details about the causes of each theory that does not outline the necessary steps to resolve conflict in order to enter the next stage.

== See also ==
- Child development
- Developmental psychology
- Ethnic identity development
- Kohlberg's stages of moral development
- Neo-Freudianism
- Positive disintegration
