= Identity crisis =

Failure to achieve ego identity during adolescent development

In Erik Erikson's theory of personality development, identity crisis is a stage that happens during adolescence. It is a period of deep reflection and examination of various perspectives on oneself.

The stage of psychosocial development in which identity crisis may occur is called identity cohesion vs. role confusion. During this stage, adolescents are faced with physical growth, sexual maturity, and integrating ideas of themselves and about what others think of them. They therefore form their self-image and endure the task of resolving the crisis of their ego identity. Successful resolution of the crisis depends on one's progress through previous developmental stages, centering on issues such as trust, autonomy, and initiative.

Erikson's interest in identity began in childhood. Born Ashkenazi Jewish, he felt that he was an outsider. His later studies of cultural life among the Yurok of northern California and the Sioux of South Dakota helped formalize his ideas about identity development and identity crisis. Erikson described those going through an identity crisis as exhibiting confusion.

== Concept ==
Adolescents may withdraw from normal life, not taking action or acting as they usually would at work, in their marriage or at school, or be unable to make defining choices about the future. They may even turn to negative activities, such as crime or drugs since from their point of view having a negative identity could be more acceptable than none at all. On the other side of the spectrum, those who emerge from the adolescent stage of personality development with a strong sense of identity are well equipped to face adulthood with confidence and certainty.

Erikson studied eight stages that made up his theory. To him, ego identity is a key concept to understanding what identity is, and it plays a large role in the conscious mind that includes fantasies, feelings, memories, perceptions, self-awareness, sensations, and thoughts; Each contributing a sense to self that is developed through social interaction. He felt that peers have a strong impact on the development of ego identity during adolescence. He believed that association with negative groups such as cults or fanatics can actually "redistrict" the developing ego during this fragile time.

The basic strength that Erikson argued should be developed during adolescence is fidelity, which only emerges from a cohesive ego identity. Fidelity encompasses sincerity, genuineness and a sense of duty in relationships with other people. Erikson defined the crisis as an argument between identity and confusion. Confusion lies between the younger generation, teenagers, and during adolescence he states that they "need to develop a sense of self and personal identity". If they do not develop this sense, they will be insecure and lose themselves, lacking confidence and certainty in adult life.

He described identity as "a subjective sense as well as an observable quality of personal sameness and continuity, paired with some belief in the sameness and continuity of some shared world image. As a quality of unself-conscious living, this can be gloriously obvious in a young person who has found himself as he has found his commonality. In him we see emerge a unique unification of what is irreversibly given—that is, body type and temperament, giftedness and vulnerability, infantile models and acquired ideals—with the open choices provided in available roles, occupational possibilities, values offered, mentors met, friendships made, and first sexual encounters."

== Marcian theory ==
James Marcia's research on identity statuses of adolescents also applies to Erikson's framework of identity crises in adolescents.

Identity foreclosure is an identity status which Marcia claimed is an identity developed by an individual without much choice. "The foreclosure status is when a commitment is made without exploring alternatives. Often these commitments are based on parental ideas and beliefs that are accepted without question". Identity foreclosure can contribute to identity crises in adolescents when the "security blanket" of their assumed identity is removed. These "foreclosed individuals often go into crisis, not knowing what to do without being able to rely on the norms, rules, and situations to which they have been accustomed". An example of this would be a son of a farmer who learns that his father is selling the farm, and whose identity as an heir to a farm and the lifestyle and identity of a farmer has been disrupted by that news.

Identity diffusion is a Marcian identity status that can lead to identity crises in adolescents. Identity diffusion can be described as "the apathetic state that represents the relative lack of both exploration and commitment". Identity diffusion can overlap with diagnoses such as schizophrenia and depression, and can best be described as a lack of identity structure. An example of an identity crisis emerging from this status is an adolescent who becomes reclusive after his identity as a star athlete is destroyed by a serious injury.

Identity moratorium is the status that Marcia theorizes lasts the longest in individuals, is the most volatile, and can be best described as "the active exploration of alternatives". Individuals experiencing identity moratorium can be very open-minded and thoughtful but also in crisis over their identity. An example of this would be a college student who lacks conviction in their future after changing majors multiple times but still cannot seem to find their passion.

Identity achievement is the resolution to many identity crises. Identity achievement occurs when the adolescent has explored and committed to important aspects of their identity.

== See also ==
- Erikson's stages of psychosocial development
- Existential crisis

== Bibliography ==
- Erikson, Erik (Fall 1970). "Autobiographic Notes on the Identity Crisis". Daedalus. 99 (The Making of Modern Science: Biographical Studies): 730–759. JSTOR 20023973. PMID 11609638.
- Schultz, D.; Schultz, S. (2009). Theories of Personality, 9th Ed. New York: Wadsworth Cengage Learning.
- Schwartz, Seth J. (2001). "The Evolution of Eriksonian and Neo-Eriksonian Identity Theory and Research: A review and Integration". Identity: An International Journal of Theory and Research. 1 (1). Lawrence Erlbaum Associates: 7–58. doi:10.1207/S1532706XSCHWARTZ. S2CID 44145970.
