= Young Man Luther =

1958 book by Erik H. Erikson

- Cover of the first edition
- Author: Erik H. Erikson
- Original title: Young Man Luther: A Study in Psychoanalysis and History
- Language: English
- Subject: Martin Luther
- Publisher: W. W. Norton & Company
- Publication date: 1958
- Publication place: United States
- Media type: Print (Hardback & Paperback)
- Pages: 288 (1962 Norton Library edition)
- ISBN: 978-0-393-00170-9

Young Man Luther: A Study in Psychoanalysis and History is a 1958 book by the psychologist Erik Erikson. It was one of the first psychobiographies of a famous historical figure. Erikson found in Martin Luther a good model of his discovery of "the identity crisis". Erikson was sure he could explain Luther's spontaneous eruption, during a monastery choir practice, "I am not!"

According to Erikson, Luther suffered through an environment that fomented crisis, and succeeded in a healthy resolution, thereby becoming more fulfilled than if the crisis had not been experienced. In the end Luther chose the obedient, provincial leadership path his father had wished for him, rather than the national fame he could have easily pursued after his celebrity and wealth, but only after Luther had disobeyed and suffered many years in an identity crisis.

== Summary ==
Erikson believed that rebellion is most likely to manifest in the youth stage of life. He suggested that before the rebellion can occur intensely, young people must first have believed in the thing they are rebelling against. Luther was thirty-four, and he had believed desperately in the authority of the very church he was rebelling against, for failing to follow the Bible. The most vocal critic will have been the most devoted and attached.

Erikson's interpretation of Martin Luther's life is that "great figures of history often spend years in a passive state. From a young age, they feel they will create a big stamp on the world, but unconsciously they wait for their particular truth to form itself in their minds, until they can make the most impact at the right time. Erikson makes the point that Martin's standing up to a Holy Roman Church can only be understood in the context of his initial disobedience to his father. Luther was not, Erikson suggests, rebellious or disobedient by nature, but having done it once, he was the reluctant "expert" who was not. He also observes that although Martin Luther made a theological point, the church was not particularly out of line with the times of the era, but it was simply Martin Luther's own personal, internal issues with himself, that manifested against the church, and by projection, a crisis of identity.

Erikson identifies a second birth with the identity crisis when it is successfully maneuvered. William James gave Erikson the idea that while once born people conform, en masse, painlessly to the consensus reality of the age, twice born people get their direction by enduring an identity crisis of such tortuous magnitude that their souls are transformed and permanently fixed into a direction as such as a reformer role for that time for that society. In Martin's case it was a "good son" vs. "good monk" crisis that gave him direction to play the good reformer of the bad church for having more concern for filling their coffers at the expense of the very souls for whom it was their true calling and their spiritual leadership role to properly attend to by the word of the Bible, and not by the whim of the institution's temporal needs.

== Reception ==
The author Richard Webster compared Young Man Luther to the classicist Norman O. Brown's Life Against Death (1959), observing that both works point to similarities between Luther's view of the human condition and psychoanalysis.

== See also ==
- Reformation
