= Erik Erikson =

American psychoanalyst and essayist (1902–1994)

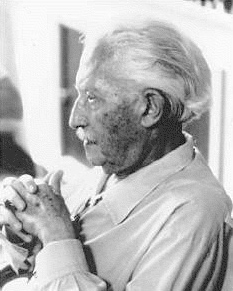
- Born: Erik Salomonsen; 15 June 1902; Frankfurt, Hesse, German Empire
- Died: 12 May 1994 (aged 91); Harwich, Massachusetts, US
- Citizenship: American; German
- Spouse: Joan Serson (m. 1930)
- Children: 4, including Kai T. Erikson
- Awards: Pulitzer Prize (1970); National Book Award (1970)

Academic background
- Influences: Ruth Benedict; Anna Freud; Sigmund Freud; Margaret Mead

Academic work
- Discipline: Psychology
- Sub-discipline: Developmental psychology; psychoanalysis
- Institutions: Yale University; University of California, Berkeley; University of Pittsburgh; Harvard University
- Notable students: Richard Sennett
- Notable works: Childhood and Society (1950); Young Man Luther (1958); Gandhi's Truth (1969); The Life Cycle Completed (1987)
- Notable ideas: Theory on psychological development
- Influenced: Eric Berne; Robert Coles; James W. Fowler; Howard Gardner; James Marcia

Erik Homburger Erikson (born Erik Salomonsen; 15 June 1902 – 12 May 1994) was a German-American child psychoanalyst and visual artist known for his theory on psychosocial development of human beings. He coined the phrase identity crisis.

Despite lacking a university degree, Erikson served as a professor at prominent institutions, including Harvard, University of California, Berkeley, and Yale. A Review of General Psychology survey, published in 2002, ranked Erikson as the 12th most eminent psychologist of the 20th century.

== Early life, family and education ==
Erikson's mother, Karla Abrahamsen, came from a prominent Jewish family in Copenhagen, Denmark. She was married to Jewish stockbroker Valdemar Isidor Salomonsen but had been estranged from him for several months at the time Erik was conceived. Little is known about Erik's biological father except that he was a non-Jewish Dane. On discovering her pregnancy, Karla fled to Frankfurt am Main in Germany where Erik was born on 15 June 1902 and was given the surname Salomonsen. She fled due to conceiving Erik out of wedlock, and the identity of Erik's birth father was never made clear.

Following Erik's birth, Karla trained to be a nurse and moved to Karlsruhe, Germany. In 1905, she married Theodor Homburger, a Jewish pediatrician. In 1908, Erik surname was changed from Salomonsen to Homburger, and in 1911 he was officially adopted by his stepfather. Karla and Theodor told Erik that Theodor was his real father, only revealing the truth to him in late childhood; he remained bitter about the deception and betrayal all his life.

The development of identity seems to have been one of Erikson's greatest concerns in his own life as well as being central to his theoretical work. As an older adult, he wrote about his adolescent "identity confusion" in his European days. "My identity confusion", he wrote, "[was at times on] the borderline between neurosis and adolescent psychosis." Erikson's daughter wrote that her father's "real psychoanalytic identity" was not established until he "replaced his stepfather's surname [Homburger] with a name of his invention [Erikson]." The decision to change his last name came about as he started his job at Yale, and the "Erikson" name was accepted by Erik's family when they became American citizens. It is said his children enjoyed the fact they would not be called "Hamburger" any longer.

Erik was a tall, blond, blue-eyed boy who was raised in the Jewish religion. Due to these mixed identities, he was a target of bigotry by both Jewish and gentile children. At temple school, his peers teased him for being Nordic; while at grammar school, he was teased for being Jewish. At Das Humanistische Gymnasium, his main interests were art, history and languages, but he lacked a general interest in school and graduated without academic distinction. After graduation, instead of attending medical school as his stepfather had desired, he attended art school in Munich, much to the liking of his mother and her friends.

Uncertain about his vocation and his fit in society, Erik dropped out of school and began a lengthy period of roaming about Germany and Italy as a wandering artist with his childhood friend Peter Blos and others. For children from prominent German families, taking a "wandering year" was not uncommon. During his travels, he often sold or traded his sketches to people he met.

== Early career, psychoanalytic experience and training ==
Eventually, Erik realized he would never become a full-time artist and returned to Karlsruhe and became an art teacher. During the time he worked at his teaching job, Erik was hired by an heiress to sketch and eventually tutor her children. Erik worked very well with these children and was eventually hired by many other families that were close to Anna and Sigmund Freud. This teaching extended into a small experimental school based in the house of Eva Rosenfeld. During this period, which lasted until he was twenty-five years old, he continued to contend with questions about his father and competing ideas of ethnic, religious, and national identity.

When Erikson was 25 years old, his friend Peter Blos invited him to Vienna to tutor art at the small Burlingham-Rosenfeld School for children whose affluent parents were undergoing psychoanalysis by Sigmund Freud's daughter, Anna Freud. Anna noticed Erikson's sensitivity to children at the school and encouraged him to study psychoanalysis at the Vienna Psychoanalytic Institute, where prominent analysts August Aichhorn, Heinz Hartmann, and Paul Federn were among those who supervised his theoretical studies. He specialized in child analysis and underwent a training analysis with Anna Freud. Helene Deutsch and Edward Bibring supervised his initial treatment of an adult. Simultaneously, he studied the Montessori method of education, which focused on child development and self-directed learning. In 1933, he received his diploma from the Vienna Psychoanalytic Institute. This and his Montessori diploma were to be Erikson's only earned credentials for his life's work.

== United States ==
In 1930, Erikson married Joan Mowat Serson, a Canadian dancer and artist whom Erikson had met at a dress ball. During their marriage, Erikson converted to Christianity. In 1933, with Adolf Hitler's rise to power in Germany, the burning of Freud's books in Berlin, and the potential Nazi persecution and threat to Austria, the family left an impoverished Vienna with their two young sons and emigrated to Copenhagen. Unable to regain Danish citizenship because of residence requirements, the family left for the US, where citizenship would not be an issue.

In the United States, Erikson became the first child psychoanalyst in Boston and held positions at Massachusetts General Hospital, the Judge Baker Guidance Center, and at Harvard Medical School and Psychological Clinic. This was while he was establishing a singular reputation as a clinician. In 1936, Erikson left Harvard and joined the staff at Yale University, where he worked at the Institute of Social Relations and taught at the medical school.

Erikson continued to deepen his interest in areas beyond psychoanalysis and to explore connections between psychology and anthropology. He made important contacts with anthropologists such as Margaret Mead, Gregory Bateson, and Ruth Benedict. Erikson said his theory of the development of thought was derived from his social and cultural studies. In 1938, he left Yale to study the Sioux tribe on their reservation in South Dakota. After his studies in South Dakota, he traveled to California to study the Yurok tribe. Erikson discovered differences between the children of the Sioux and Yurok tribes. This marked the beginning of Erikson's lifelong passion of showing the importance of events in childhood and how society affects them.

In 1939, he left Yale, and the Eriksons moved to California, where Erik had been invited to join a team conducting a longitudinal study of child development at the University of California at Berkeley's Institute of Child Welfare. In addition, in San Francisco, he opened a private practice in child psychoanalysis.

While in California he was able to make his second study of Native American children when he joined anthropologist Alfred Kroeber on a field trip to Northern California to study the Yurok people.

In 1950, after publishing the book, Childhood and Society, for which he is best known, Erikson left the University of California when California's Levering Act required professors there to sign loyalty oaths. From 1951 to 1960, he worked and taught at the Austen Riggs Center, a prominent psychiatric treatment facility in Stockbridge, Massachusetts, where he worked with emotionally troubled young people. Another famous Stockbridge resident, Norman Rockwell, became Erikson's patient and friend. During this time, he also served as a visiting professor at the University of Pittsburgh where he worked with Benjamin Spock and Fred Rogers at Arsenal Nursery School of the Western Psychiatric Institute.

He returned to Harvard in the 1960s as a professor of human development and remained there until his retirement in 1970. In 1973, the National Endowment for the Humanities selected Erikson for the Jefferson Lecture, the United States' highest honor for achievement in the humanities. Erikson's lecture was titled Dimensions of a New Identity.

== Theories of development and the ego ==
Erikson is credited with being one of the originators of ego psychology, which emphasized the role of the ego as being more than a servant of the id. Although Erikson accepted Freud's theory, he did not focus on the parent-child relationship and gave more importance to the role of the ego, particularly the person's progression as self. According to Erikson, the environment in which a child lived was crucial to providing growth, adjustment, a source of self-awareness and identity. Erikson won a Pulitzer Prize and a US National Book Award in category Philosophy and Religion for Gandhi's Truth (1969), which focused more on his theory as applied to later phases in the life cycle.

In Erikson's discussion of development, he rarely mentioned a stage of development by age. In fact he referred to it as a prolonged adolescence which has led to further investigation into a period of development between adolescence and young adulthood called emerging adulthood. Erikson's theory of development includes various psychosocial crises where each conflict builds off of the previous stages. The result of each conflict can have negative or positive impacts on a person's development, however, a negative outcome can be revisited and readdressed throughout the life span. On the topic of ego identity versus role confusion: ego identity enables each person to have a sense of individuality, or as Erikson would say, "Ego identity, then, in its subjective aspect, is the awareness of the fact that there is a self-sameness and continuity to the ego's synthesizing methods and a continuity of one's meaning for others". Role confusion, however, is, according to Barbara Engler, "the inability to conceive of oneself as a productive member of one's own society." This inability to conceive of oneself as a productive member is a great danger; it can occur during adolescence, when looking for an occupation.

== Theory of personality ==
The Erikson life-stages, in order of the eight stages in which they may be acquired, are listed below, as well as the "virtues" that Erikson has attached to these stages, (these virtues are underlined). The term "virtue" refers to favorable outcomes of each stage and is used in the context of Erikson's work as it is applied to medicine, meaning "potencies". These virtues are also interpreted to be the same as "strengths", which are considered inherent in the individual life cycle and in the sequence of generations. Erikson's research suggests that each individual must learn how to hold both extremes of each specific life-stage challenge in tension with one another, not rejecting one end of the tension or the other. Only when both extremes in a life-stage challenge are understood and accepted as both required and useful, can the optimal virtue for that stage surface. Thus, 'trust' and 'mis-trust' must both be understood and accepted, in order for realistic 'hope' to emerge as a viable solution at the first stage. Similarly, 'integrity' and 'despair' must both be understood and embraced, in order for actionable 'wisdom' to emerge as a viable solution at the last stage.

=== 1. Hope: basic trust vs. basic mistrust ===
This stage covers the period of infancy, 0–1½ years old, which is the most fundamental stage of life, as this is the stage that all other ones build on. Whether the baby develops basic trust or basic distrust is not merely a matter of nurture. It is multi-faceted and has strong social components. It depends on the quality of the maternal relationship. The mother carries out and reflects her inner perceptions of trustworthiness, a sense of personal meaning, etc. on the child. An important part of this stage is providing stable and constant care of the infant. This helps the child develop trust that can transition into relationships other than parental. Additionally, children develop trust in others to support them. If successful in this, the baby develops a sense of trust, which "forms the basis in the child for a sense of identity." Failure to develop this trust will result in a feeling of fear and a sense that the world is inconsistent and unpredictable.

=== 2. Will: autonomy vs. shame ===
This stage covers early childhood around 1½–3 years old and introduces the concept of autonomy vs. shame and doubt. The child begins to discover the beginnings of their independence, and parents must facilitate the child's sense of doing basic tasks "all by themselves." Discouragement can lead to the child doubting their efficacy. During this stage the child is usually trying to master toilet training. Additionally, the child discovers their talents or abilities, and it is important to ensure the child is able to explore those activities. Erikson states it is essential to allow the children freedom in exploration but also create an environment welcoming of failures. Therefore, the parent should not punish or reprimand the child for failing at the task. Shame and doubt occurs when the child feels incompetent in ability to complete tasks and survive. Will is achieved with success of this stage. Children successful in this stage will have "self-control without a loss of self-esteem."

=== 3. Purpose: initiative vs. guilt ===
This stage covers preschool children from ages three to five. Does the child have the ability to do things on their own, such as dress themselves? Children in this stage are interacting with peers, and creating their own games and activities. They practice independence and start to make their own decisions. If allowed to make these decisions, a child will develop confidence in their ability to lead others. If the child is not allowed to make certain decisions, then a sense of guilt develops. Guilt in this stage is characterized by a sense of being a burden to others, and the child will therefore usually present themselves as a follower as they lack the confidence to do otherwise. Additionally, the child is asking many questions to build knowledge of the world. If the questions earn responses that are critical and condescending, the child will also develop feelings of guilt. Success in this stage leads to the virtue of purpose, which is the normal balance between the two extremes.

=== 4. Competence: industry vs. inferiority ===
This area coincides with the "latency" period of psychoanalysis and covers school age children before adolescence. Children compare their self worth to others around them. Friends can have a significant impact on the growth of the child. The child can recognize major disparities in personal abilities relative to other children. Erikson places some emphasis on the teacher, who should ensure that children do not feel inferior. During this stage, the child's friend group becomes increasingly important in their life. Often during this stage the child will try to prove competency with things rewarded in society, and also develop satisfaction with their abilities. Encouraging the child increases feelings of adequacy and competency in the ability to reach goals. Restriction from teachers or parents leads to doubt, questioning, and reluctance in abilities and therefore may not reach full capabilities. Competence, the virtue of this stage, is developed when a healthy balance between the two extremes is reached.

=== 5. Fidelity: identity vs. role confusion ===
This section deals with adolescence, meaning those between twelve and eighteen years old. This occurs when we start to question ourselves and ask questions relevant to who we are and what we want to accomplish. Who am I, how do I fit in? Where am I going in life? The adolescent is exploring and seeking for their own unique identity. This is done by looking at personal beliefs, goals, and values. The individual's morality is also explored and developed. Erikson believes that if the parents allow the child to explore, they will determine their own identity. If, however, the parents continually push them to conform to their views, the teen will face identity confusion. The teen is also looking towards the future in terms of employment, relationships, and families. Learning the roles they provide in society is essential since the teen begins to develop the desire to fit into society. Fidelity is characterized by the ability to commit to others and acceptance of others even with differences. Identity crisis is the result of role confusion and can cause the adolescent to try out different lifestyles.

=== 6. Love: intimacy vs. isolation ===
This is the first stage of adult development. This development usually happens during young adulthood, which is between the ages of 18 and 40. This stage marks a transition from just thinking about ourselves to thinking about other people in the world. We are social creatures and as a result need to be with other people and form relationships with them. Dating, marriage, family and friendships are important during this stage in their life. This is due to the increase in the growth of intimate relationships with others.

Ego development earlier in life (middle adolescence) is a strong predictor of how well intimacy for romantic relationships will transpire in emerging adulthood. By successfully forming loving relationships with other people, individuals are able to experience love and intimacy. They also feel safety, care, and commitment in these relationships. Furthermore, if individuals are able to successfully resolve the crisis of intimacy versus isolation, they are able to achieve the virtue of love. Those who fail to form lasting relationships may feel isolated and alone.

=== 7. Care: generativity vs. stagnation ===
The second stage of adulthood happens between the ages of 40 and 65. During this time people are normally settled in their lives and know what is important to them. A person is either making progress in their career or treading lightly in their career and unsure if this is what they want to do for the rest of their working life. Also, during this time, a person may be raising their children. If they are a parent, then they are reevaluating their life roles. This is one way of contributing to society along with productivity at work and involvement in community activities and organizations. Individuals who exercise the concept of generativity believe in the next generation and seek to nurture them in creative ways through practices such as parenting, teaching, and mentoring. Having a sense of generativity can be considered significant for both the individual and the society, exemplifying their roles as effective parents, leaders for organizations, etc. If a person is not comfortable with the way their life is progressing, they're usually regretful about the decisions that they have made in the past and feel a sense of uselessness.

=== 8. Wisdom: ego integrity vs. despair ===
This stage affects the age group of 65 and on. During this time, an individual has reached the last chapter in their life and retirement is approaching or has already taken place. Individuals in this stage must learn to accept the course of their life or they will look back on it with despair. Ego-integrity means the acceptance of life in its fullness: the victories and the defeats, what was accomplished and what was not accomplished. Wisdom is the result of successfully accomplishing this final developmental task. Wisdom is defined as "informed and detached concern for life itself in the face of death itself." Having a guilty conscience about the past or failing to accomplish important goals will eventually lead to depression and hopelessness. Achieving the virtue of the stage involves the feeling of living a successful life.

=== Ninth stage ===
For the Ninth Stage see Erikson's stages of psychosocial development § Ninth Stage.

== Psychology of religion ==
Psychoanalytic writers have always engaged in nonclinical interpretation of cultural phenomena such as art, religion, and historical movements. Erik Erikson gave such a strong contribution that his work was well received by students of religion and spurred various secondary literature.

Erikson's psychology of religion begins with an acknowledgement of how religious tradition can have an interplay with a child's basic sense of trust or mistrust. With regard to Erikson's theory of personality as expressed in his eight stages of the life cycle, each with their different tasks to master, each also included a corresponding virtue, as mentioned above, which form a taxonomy for religious and ethical life. Erikson extends this construct by emphasizing that human individual and social life is characterized by ritualization, "an agreed-upon interplay between at least two persons who repeat it at meaningful intervals and in recurring contexts." Such ritualization involves careful attentiveness to what can be called ceremonial forms and details, higher symbolic meanings, active engagement of participants, and a feeling of absolute necessity. Each life cycle stage includes its own ritualization with a corresponding ritualism: numinous vs. idolism, judicious vs. legalism, dramatic vs. impersonation, formal vs. formalism, ideological vs. totalism, affiliative vs. elitism, generational vs. authoritism, and integral vs. dogmatism.

Perhaps Erikson's best-known contributions to the psychology of religion were his book length psychobiographies, Young Man Luther: A Study in Psychoanalysis and History, on Martin Luther, and Gandhi's Truth, on Mahatma Gandhi, for which he remarkably won the Pulitzer Prize and the National Book Award. Both books attempt to show how childhood development and parental influence, social and cultural context, and even political crises form a confluence with personal identity. These studies demonstrate how each influential person discovered mastery, both individually and socially, in what Erikson would call the historical moment. Individuals like Luther or Gandhi were what Erikson called a Homo Religiosus, individuals for whom the final life cycle challenge of integrity vs. despair is a lifelong crisis, and they become gifted innovators whose own psychological cure becomes an ideological breakthrough for their time.

== Personal life ==
Erikson married Canadian-born American dancer and artist Joan Erikson (née Sarah Lucretia Serson) in 1930, and they remained together until his death.

The Eriksons had four children: Kai T. Erikson, Jon Erikson, Sue Erikson Bloland, and Neil Erikson. His eldest son, Kai, was an American sociologist. Their daughter, Sue, "an integrative psychotherapist and psychoanalyst", described her father as plagued by "lifelong feelings of personal inadequacy". He thought that by combining resources with his wife, he could "achieve the recognition" that might produce a feeling of adequacy.

Erikson died on 12 May 1994 in Harwich, Massachusetts. He is buried in the First Congregational Church Cemetery in Harwich.

== Bibliography ==
=== Major works ===
- Childhood and Society (1950)
- Young Man Luther: A Study in Psychoanalysis and History (1958)
- Insight and Responsibility (1966)
- Insight and freedom (1968)
- Identity: Youth and Crisis (1968)
- Gandhi's Truth: On the Origins of Militant Nonviolence (1969)
- The Twentieth-century sciences (1972)
- In search of common ground (1973)
- Life History and the Historical Moment (1975)
- Toys and Reasons: Stages in the Ritualization of Experience (1977)
- Adulthood (edited book, 1978)
- Vital Involvement in Old Age (with J. M. Erikson and H. Kivnick, 1986)
- Erikson, Erik H.; Erikson, Joan M. (1998). The Life Cycle Completed (Extended ed.). New York: W. W. Norton & Company. ISBN 978-0-393-34743-2.

=== Collections ===
- Identity and the Life Cycle. Selected Papers (1959)
- "A Way of Looking at Things – Selected Papers from 1930 to 1980, Erik H. Erikson" ed. by S. Schlein, W. W. Norton & Co, New York, (1995)

== See also ==
- Erikson Institute
