= Affective neuroscience =

Study of the neural mechanisms of emotion

Affective neuroscience is the study of how the brain processes emotions. This field combines neuroscience with the psychological study of personality, emotion, and mood. The basis of emotions and what emotions are remains an issue of debate within the field of affective neuroscience.

The term "affective neuroscience" was coined by neuroscientist Jaak Panksepp in the early 1990s, at a time when cognitive neuroscience focused on parts of psychology that did not include emotion, such as attention or memory.

== Brain areas related to emotion ==
Emotions are thought to be related to activity in brain areas that direct our attention, motivate our behavior, and help us make decisions about our environment. Early stages of research on emotions and the brain was conducted by Paul Broca, James Papez, and Paul D. MacLean. Their work suggests that emotion is related to a group of structures in the center of the brain called the limbic system. The limbic system is made up of the following brain structures:

=== Limbic system ===
- Amygdala – The amygdala is made up of two small, round structures located closer to the forehead (anterior) to the hippocampi near the temporal poles. The amygdalae are involved in detecting and learning which parts of our surroundings are important and have emotional significance. They are critical for the production of emotion. They are known to be very important for negative emotions, especially fear. Amygdala activation often happens when we see a potential threat. The amygdala uses our past and related memories to help us make decisions about what is currently happening.
- Thalamus – The thalamus is involved in combining sensory and motor signals and then sending that information to the cerebral cortex. The thalamus plays an important role in regulating sleep and wakefulness.
- Hypothalamus – The hypothalamus is involved in producing a physical response (for example, crying) with an emotion. The hypothalamus is also used in reward circuits which are associated with positive emotions.
- Hippocampus – The hippocampus is a structure that is mainly involved in memory. It works to make new memories and also connects senses such as visual input, smell or sound to memories. The hippocampus allows long term memories to be stored and retrieves them when necessary.
- Fornix – The fornix is the main connection between the hippocampus to the mammillary bodies. It is important for spatial memory functions, episodic memory and executive functions.
- Mammillary body – Mammillary bodies are important for recollective memory. They are found by the brain stem and cerebrum.
- Olfactory bulb – The olfactory bulbs are the first cranial nerves. They are involved in smell (olfaction) and memory that is connected with specific smells.
- Cingulate gyrus – The cingulate gyrus is located above the corpus callosum. The parts of the cingulate gyrus have different functions, and are involved with affect, visceromotor control, response selection, skeletomotor control, visuospatial processing, and in memory access. The anterior cingulate cortex is important for conscious, subjective emotional awareness as well as motivation. The subgenual cingulate is more active during both experimentally induced sadness and during depressive episodes.

Research has shown the limbic system is directly related to emotion, but there are other brain areas and structures that are important for producing and processing emotion.

=== Other brain structures ===
- Basal ganglia – Basal ganglia are groups of nuclei found on either side of the thalamus. Basal ganglia play an important role in motivation, action selection and reward learning.
- Orbitofrontal cortex – The orbitofrontal cortex is involved in decision making and helping us understand how emotions have influenced our decision making.
- Prefrontal cortex – The prefrontal cortex is the front of the brain, behind the forehead and above the eyes. It plays a role in regulating emotion and behavior by anticipating consequences. The prefrontal cortex also plays an important role in delayed gratification by maintaining emotions over time and organizing behavior toward specific goals.
  - The ventromedial prefrontal cortex (vmPFC) is a portion of the prefrontal cortex that has shown to have a significant influence on emotion regulation. Through studies, the vmPFC has shown high activation when presented with highly emotional stimuli. This suggests that this portion of the brain is essential for high emotional arousal.
- Ventral striatum – The ventral striatum is a group of structures thought to play a role in emotion and behavior. An area of the ventral striatum known as the nucleus accumbens is involved in the experience of pleasure. It is common for individuals with addictions to exhibit increased activity in this area when they are exposed to the object of their addiction.
- Insula – This area of the brain plays a significant role in bodily emotions due to its connections to other neural structures that control automatic functions such as heart rate, breathing, and digestion. The insula is also implicated in empathy and awareness of emotion.
- Cerebellum – Cerebellum has many uses. Has a very important role in emotion perception and emotion attributions. Cerebellar dysfunction has been shown to decrease positive emotions during lesion studies. Over the course of evolution, the cerebellum may have evolved into a circuit that helps reduce fear in order to enhance survival. The cerebellum may also play a regulatory role in the neural response to rewarding stimuli, such as money, addictive drugs, and orgasm.
  - A "cerebellar cognitive affective syndrome" has been described resulting in personality change and how the person shows emotions.
- Lateral prefrontal cortex – Using our emotions, the lateral prefrontal cortex is responsible for helping us reach our goals by suppressing harmful behaviors or selecting productive ones.
- Primary sensorimotor cortex – The somatosensory cortex is involved in each stage of emotional processing. We use it to collect information that helps us in identifying and creating emotion, and then regulate that emotion once it has started.
- Temporal cortex – This brain area is important in processing sound, speech, and language use, as well as helping us understand others faces and others emotions based on facial cues. The temporal cortex is responsible for determining the quality and content of our emotional memories.
- Brainstem – The brainstem is composed of three parts: ascending (sensory information), descending (motor information), and modulatory. The brainstem takes information from our environment (ascending) and creates a bodily response (descending) such as crying. The information from the environment and our body's responses to the information we receive is combined in the modulatory part of the brain stem and we are then able to label an emotion.

== Right hemisphere ==
Many theories about the role of the right hemisphere in emotion has resulted in several models of emotional functioning. After observing decreased emotional processing after right hemisphere injuries, C.K. Mills hypothesized emotions are directly related to the right hemisphere. In 1992, researchers found that emotional expression and understanding may be controlled by smaller brain structures in the right hemisphere. These findings were the basis for the right hemisphere hypothesis and the valence hypothesis.

=== Right hemisphere hypothesis ===
It is believed that the right hemisphere is more specialized in processing emotions than the left hemisphere. The right hemisphere is associated with nonverbal, synthetic, integrative, holistic and gestaltic mental strategies. As demonstrated by patients who have increased spatial neglect when damage affects the right brain rather than the left brain, the right hemisphere is more connected to subcortical systems of autonomic arousal and attention. Right hemisphere disorders have been associated with abnormal patterns of autonomic nervous system responses. These findings suggest the right hemisphere and subcortical brain areas are closely related.

=== Valence hypothesis ===
According to the valence hypothesis, although the right hemisphere is involved in emotion, it is primarily involved in the processing of negative emotions, while the left hemisphere is involved in processing positive emotions. In one explanation, negative emotions are processed by the right brain, while positive emotions are processed by the left. An alternative explanation is that the right hemisphere is dominant when it comes to feeling both positive and negative emotions. Recent studies indicate that the frontal lobes of both hemispheres play an active role in emotions, while the parietal and temporal lobes process them. Depression has been associated with decreased right parietal lobe activity, while anxiety has been associated with increased right parietal lobe activity. Based on the original valence model, increasingly complex models have been developed as a result of the increasing understanding of the different hemispheres.

== Cognitive neuroscience ==
While emotions are integral to thought processes, cognition has been investigated without emotion until the late 1990s, focusing instead on non-emotional processes such as memory, attention, perception, problem solving, and mental imagery. Cognitive neuroscience and affective neuroscience have emerged as separate fields for studying the neural basis of non-emotional and emotional processes. Despite the fact that fields are classified according to how the brain processes cognition and emotion, the neural and mental mechanisms behind emotional and non-emotional processes often overlap.

== Cognitive neuroscience tasks in affective neuroscience research ==
=== Emotion go/no-go ===
Emotion go/no-go tasks are used to study behavioral inhibition, especially how it is influenced by emotion. A "go" cue tells the participant to respond rapidly, but a "no-go" cue tells them to withhold a response. Because the "go" cue occurs more frequently, it can be used to measure how well a subject suppresses a response under different emotional conditions.

This task is often used in combination with neuroimaging in healthy individuals and patients with affective disorders to identify relevant brain functions associated with emotional regulation. Several studies, including go/no-go studies, suggest that sections of the prefrontal cortex are involved in controlling emotional responses to stimuli during inhibition.

=== Emotional Stroop ===
Adapted from the Stroop, the emotional Stroop test measures how much attention you pay to emotional stimuli. In this task, participants are instructed to name the ink color of words while ignoring their meanings. Generally, people have trouble detaching their attention from words with an affective meaning compared with neutral words. It has been demonstrated in several studies that naming the color of neutral words results in a quicker response.

Selective attention to negative or threatening stimuli, which are often related to psychological disorders, is commonly tested with this task. Different mental disorders have been associated with specific attentional biases. Participants with spider phobia, for example, tend to be more inclined to use spider-related words than negatively charged words. Similar findings have been found for threat words related to other anxiety disorders. Even so, other studies have questioned these conclusions. When the words are matched for emotionality, anxious participants in some studies show the Stroop interference effect for both negative and positive words. In other words, the specificity effects of words for various disorders may be primarily due to their conceptual relation to the disorder's concerns rather than their emotionality.

=== Ekman 60 faces task ===
The Ekman faces task is used to measure emotion recognition of six basic emotions. Black and white photographs of 10 actors (6 male, 4 female) are presented, with each actor displaying each emotion. Participants are usually asked to respond quickly with the name of the displayed emotion. The task is a common tool to study deficits in emotion regulation in patients with dementia, Parkinson's, and other cognitively degenerative disorders. The task has been used to analyze recognition errors in disorders such as borderline personality disorder, schizophrenia, and bipolar disorder.

=== Dot probe (emotion) ===
The emotional dot-probe paradigm is a task used to assess selective visual attention to and failure to detach attention from affective stimuli. The paradigm begins with a fixation cross at the center of a screen. An emotional stimulus and a neutral stimulus appear side by side, after which a dot appears behind either the neutral stimulus (incongruent condition) or the affective stimulus (congruent condition). Participants are asked to indicate when they see this dot, and response latency is measured. Dots that appear on the same side of the screen as the image the participant was looking at will be identified more quickly. Thus, it is possible to discern which object the participant was attending to by subtracting the reaction time to respond to congruent versus incongruent trials.

The best documented research with the dot probe paradigm involves attention to threat related stimuli, such as fearful faces, in individuals with anxiety disorders. Anxious individuals tend to respond more quickly to congruent trials, which may indicate vigilance to threat and/or failure to detach attention from threatening stimuli. A specificity effect of attention has also been noted, with individuals attending selectively to threats related to their particular disorder. For example, those with social phobia selectively attend to social threats but not physical threats. However, this specificity may be even more nuanced. Participants with obsessive-compulsive disorder symptoms initially show attentional bias to compulsive threat, but this bias is attenuated in later trials due to habituation to the threat stimuli.

=== Fear potentiated startle ===
Fear-potentiated startle (FPS) has been utilized as a psychophysiological index of fear reaction in both animals and humans. FPS is most often assessed through the magnitude of the eyeblink startle reflex, which can be measured by electromyography. This eyeblink reflex is an automatic defensive reaction to an abrupt elicitor, making it an objective indicator of fear. Typical FPS paradigms involve bursts of noise or abrupt flashes of light transmitted while an individual attends to a set of stimuli. Startle reflexes have been shown to be modulated by emotion. For example, healthy participants tend to show enhanced startle responses while viewing negatively valenced images and attenuated startle while viewing positively valenced images, as compared with neutral images.

The startle response to a particular stimulus is greater under conditions of threat. A common example given to indicate this phenomenon is that one's startle response to a flash of light will be greater when walking in a dangerous neighborhood at night than it would under safer conditions. In laboratory studies, the threat of receiving shock is enough to potentiate startle, even without any actual shock.

Fear potentiated startle paradigms are often used to study fear learning and extinction in individuals with post-traumatic stress disorder (PTSD) and other anxiety disorders. In fear conditioning studies, an initially neutral stimulus is repeatedly paired with an aversive one, borrowing from classical conditioning. FPS studies have demonstrated that PTSD patients have enhanced startle responses during both danger cues and neutral/safety cues as compared with healthy participants.

== Learning ==
Affect plays many roles during learning. Deep, emotional attachment to a subject area allows a deeper understanding of the material and therefore, learning occurs and lasts. The emotions evoked when reading in comparison to the emotions portrayed in the content affects comprehension. Someone who is feeling sad understands a sad passage better than someone feeling happy. Therefore, a student's emotion plays an important role during the learning process.

Emotion can be embodied or perceived from words read on a page or in a facial expression. Neuroimaging studies using fMRI have demonstrated that the same area of the brain that is activated when feeling disgust is activated when observing another's disgust. In a traditional learning environment, the teacher's facial expression can play a critical role in language acquisition. Showing a fearful facial expression when reading passages that contain fearful tones facilitates students learning of the meaning of certain vocabulary words and comprehension of the passage.

== Models ==
The neurobiological basis of emotion is still disputed. The existence of basic emotions and their defining attributes represents a long lasting and yet unsettled issue in psychology. The available research suggests that the neurobiological existence of basic emotions is still tenable and heuristically seminal, pending some reformulation.

=== Basic emotions ===
These approaches hypothesize that emotion categories (including happiness, sadness, fear, anger, and disgust) are biologically basic. In this view, emotions are inherited, biologically based modules that cannot be separated into more basic psychological components. Models following this approach hypothesize that all mental states belonging to a single emotional category can be consistently and specifically localized to either a single brain region or a defined network of brain regions. Each basic emotion category also shares other universal characteristics: distinct facial behavior, physiology, subjective experience and accompanying thoughts and memories.

=== Psychological constructionist approaches ===
This approach to emotion hypothesizes that emotions like happiness, sadness, fear, anger and disgust (and many others) are constructed mental states that occur when brain systems work together. In this view, networks of brain regions underlie psychological operations (e.g., language, attention, etc.) that interact to produce emotion, perception, and cognition. One psychological operation critical for emotion is the network of brain regions that underlie valence (feeling pleasant/unpleasant) and arousal (feeling activated and energized). Emotions emerge when neural systems underlying different psychological operations interact (not just those involved in valence and arousal), producing distributed patterns of activation across the brain. Because emotions emerge from more basic components, heterogeneity affects each emotion category; for example, a person can experience many different kinds of fear, which feel differently, and which correspond to different neural patterns in the brain.

== Aging ==
People typically associate aging with a decline in the functioning of all mental processing abilities; however, this is not the case for emotion regulation. Older adults typically have a stronger drive to maintain and improve on their emotional well being. Thus providing them to utilize emotion regulation skills that provide a higher satisfaction in life.

=== Role of the vmPFC in emotion regulation of older adults ===
The ventromedial prefrontal cortex (vmPFC) has a significant influence on emotion regulation, especially regarding high emotional arousing stimuli. Compared to other areas of the prefrontal cortex (PFC), the vmPFC loses volume at a much lower rate. Due to this, an older person's emotional regulation abilities are not heavily impacted by brain changes associated with aging. Additionally, the anterior cingulate cortex (ACC) is an important area of the brain that is used for emotion regulation. The ACC has proven to be a key player in emotion regulation in not just young adults, but also in older adults. In older adults the ACC is important to create connections with from the vmPFC in order to regulate emotions. This connection was the most salient when negative emotions were reappraised. This demonstrates that older adults use the vmPFC to regulate their emotions in a more positive manner. Despite other areas of the brain decreasing in functionality as humans age, the connection between the vmPFC and ACC remains strong to reappraise negative emotions into more positive emotions. This is different from younger adults, who rely more on other areas of the PFC.

=== Neuropsychology behind older adults emotion regulation differences ===
As people age, most cognitive functions decline. This is not the case when it comes to emotion regulation. A study conducted by Carstensen and colleagues (2000) found that as people increase in age so does their ability to regulate their emotions. Just because older adults had better emotion regulation skills, does not mean they live more stable daily lives. In fact, they tend to have more unstable negative emotions especially in comparison to the stability of their positive emotions. The major difference observed in how older adults and younger adults regulate their emotions when negative emotional stimuli are present can be explained by numerous theories.

=== Theories of emotion regulation in aging ===
==== Passive method of emotion regulation ====
How older adults handle emotionally salient events or stimuli are often vastly different from younger adults, and even middle aged adults. There does not appear to be many differences in ways that younger, middle, and older adults handle social situations; however, when a social situation becomes emotionally charged differences emerge. When intense emotions in a social situation were evoked for older adults, they tended to the situation in a more passive manner in comparison to middle aged adults. They also tend to rely more on their previous problem solving skills than both younger and older adults. This is because as people age, there tends to be a shift in preferences to maintain a more positive emotional affect. In fact, there seems to be a decrease in negative emotions felt by older adults once until they reach the age of 60, in which this decrease stops. While the frequency of negative emotion decreases with age, the intensity of the emotions experienced does not change. Additionally, emotional satisfaction is not lower just because they experience less frequent negative emotions.

==== Socioemotional selectivity theory ====
Carstensen (2003) hypothesized that the reason that older adults tended to have better emotion regulation skills than younger adults is due to the socioemotional selectivity theory. This theory highlights the role of social interactions in the ability to regulate emotions. Social interactions, while are often positive, can sometimes lead to negative emotional arousal. Since older adults have been alive longer, they have more dense social networks. This creates a drastic increase in social interaction that cause positive emotional arousal. On the chance they experience a negative emotional reaction from a social event, they are likely to be able to pair it with something that is more positively emotionally salient. This causes the negative emotion to be less potent, and therefore increase their hedonic perspective on life.

== Meta-analyses ==
A meta-analysis is a statistical approach to synthesizing results across multiple studies. Included studies investigated healthy, unmedicated adults and that used subtraction analysis to examine brain areas that were more active during emotional processing than during a neutral (control) condition.

=== Phan et al. 2002 ===
In the first neuroimaging meta-analysis of emotion, Phan et al. (2002) analyzed the results of 55 peer reviewed studies between January 1990 and December 2000 to determine if the emotions of fear, sadness, disgust, anger, and happiness were consistently associated with activity in specific brain regions. All studies used fMRI or PET techniques to investigate higher-order mental processing of emotion (studies of low-order sensory or motor processes were excluded). The authors' tabulated the number of studies that reported activation in specific brain regions. For each brain region, statistical chi-squared analysis was conducted. Two regions showed a statistically significant association. In the amygdala, 66% of studies inducing fear reported activity in this region, as compared to ~20% of studies inducing happiness, ~15% of studies inducing sadness (with no reported activations for anger or disgust). In the subcallosal cingulate, 46% of studies inducing sadness reported activity in this region, as compared to ~20% inducing happiness and ~20% inducing anger. This pattern of clear discriminability between emotion categories was in fact rare, with other patterns occurring in limbic regions, paralimbic regions, and uni/heteromodal regions. Brain regions implicated across discrete emotion included the basal ganglia (~60% of studies inducing happiness and ~60% of studies inducing disgust reported activity in this region) and medial prefrontal cortex (happiness ~60%, anger ~55%, sadness ~40%, disgust ~40%, and fear ~30%).

=== Murphy et al. 2003 ===
Murphy, et al. 2003 analyzed 106 peer reviewed studies published between January 1994 and December 2001 to examine the evidence for regional specialization of discrete emotions (fear, disgust, anger, happiness and sadness) across a larger set of studies. Studies included in the meta-analysis measured activity in the whole brain and regions of interest (activity in individual regions of particular interest to the study). 3D Kolmogorov-Smirnov (KS3) statistics were used to compare rough spatial distributions of 3D activation patterns to determine if statistically significant activations were specific to particular brain regions for all emotional categories. This pattern of consistently activated, regionally specific activations was identified in four brain regions: amygdala with fear (~40% of studies), insula with disgust (~70%), globus pallidus with disgust (~70%), and lateral orbitofrontal cortex with anger (80%). Other regions showed different patterns of activation across categories. For example, both the dorsal medial prefrontal cortex and the rostral anterior cingulate cortex showed consistent activity across emotions (happiness ~50%, sadness ~50%, anger ~ 40%, fear ~30%, and disgust ~ 20%).

=== Barrett et al. 2006 ===
Barrett, et al. 2006 examined 161 studies published between 1990 and 2001. The authors compared the consistency and specificity of prior meta-analytic findings specific to each notional basic emotion. Consistent neural patterns were defined by brain regions showing increased activity for a specific emotion (relative to a neutral control condition), regardless of the method of induction used (for example, visual vs. auditory cue). Specific neural patterns were defined as separate circuits for one emotion vs. the other emotions (for example, the fear circuit must be discriminable from the anger circuit, although both may include common brain regions). In general, the results supported Phan et al. and Murphy et al., but not specificity. Consistency was determined through the comparison of chi-squared analyses that revealed whether the proportion of studies reporting activation during one emotion was significantly higher than the proportion of studies reporting activation during the other emotions. Specificity was determined through the comparison of emotion-category brain-localizations by contrasting activations in key regions that were specific to particular emotions. Increased amygdala activation during fear was the most consistently reported across induction methods (but not specific). Both meta-analyses associated the anterior cingulate cortex with sadness, although this finding was less consistent (across induction methods) and was not specific. Both meta-analyses found that disgust was associated with the basal ganglia, but these findings were neither consistent nor specific. Neither consistent nor specific activity was observed across the meta-analyses for anger or happiness. This meta-analysis introduced the concept of the basic, irreducible elements of emotional life as dimensions such as approach and avoidance.

=== Kober et al. 2008 ===
Kober reviewed 162 neuroimaging studies published between 1990 and 2005 in order to determine if specific brain regions were activated when experiencing an emotion directly and (indirectly) through the experience of someone else. According to the study, six different functional groups showed similar activation patterns. The psychological functions of each group were discussed in more basic terms. These regions may also play a role in processing visual information and paying attention to emotional signals.

Groups
Group	Regions	Notes
Core limbic	left amygdala, hypothalamus, periaqueductal gray/thalamus regions, and amygdala/ventral striatum/ventral globus pallidus/thalamus regions	A functional emotional center responsible for evaluating affective significance.
Lateral Paralimbic	ventral anterior insula/frontal operculum/right temporal pole/ posterior orbitofrontal cortex, the anterior insula/ posterior orbitofrontal cortex, the ventral anterior insula/ temporal cortex/ orbitofrontal cortex junction, the midinsula/ dorsal putamen, and the ventral striatum /mid insula/ left hippocampus	Contributes to motivation, especially in reward, by making stimuli more valuable.
Medial Prefrontal Cortex	dorsal medial prefrontal cortex, pregenual anterior cingulate cortex, and rostral dorsal anterior cingulate cortex	Plays a role in both the generation and regulation of emotion.
Cognitive/ Motor Network	right frontal operculum, the right interior frontal gyrus, and the pre-supplementray motor area/ left interior frontal gyrus, regions	Plays a general role in information processing and cognitive control.
Occipital/ Visual Association	V8 and V4 areas of the primary visual cortex, the medial temporal lobe, and the lateral occipital cortex	
Medial Posterior	posterior cingulate cortex and area V1 of the primary visual cortex	

=== Vytal et al. 2010 ===
Vytal, et al. 2010 examined 83 neuroimaging studies published between 1993–2008 to examine whether neuroimaging evidence supports biologically discrete, basic emotions (i.e. fear, anger, disgust, happiness, and sadness). Consistency analyses identified brain regions associated with individual emotions. Discriminability analyses identified brain regions that were differentially active under contrasting pairs of emotions. This meta-analysis examined PET or fMRI studies that reported whole brain analyses identifying significant activations for at least one of the five emotions relative to a neutral or control condition. The authors used activation likelihood estimation (ALE) to perform spatially sensitive, voxel-wise (sensitive to the spatial properties of voxels) statistical comparisons across studies. This technique allows for direct statistical comparison between activation maps associated with each discrete emotion. Thus, discriminability between the five discrete emotion categories was assessed on a more precise spatial scale than in prior meta-analyses.

Consistency was first assessed by comparing the cross-study ALE map for each emotion to ALE maps generated by random permutations. Discriminability was assessed by pair-wise contrasts of emotion maps. Consistent and discriminable activation patterns were observed for the five categories.

Associations
Emotion	Peak	Regions
Happiness	right superior temporal gyrus, left rostral anterior cingulate cortex	9 regional brain clusters
Sadness	left medial frontal gyrus	35 clusters - especially, left medial frontal gyrus, right middle temporal gyrus, and right inferior frontal gyrus
Anger	left inferior frontal gyrus	13 clusters - bilateral inferior frontal gyrus, and in right parahippocampal gyrus
Fear	left amygdala	11 clusters - left amygdala and left putamen
Disgust	right insula/ right inferior frontal gyrus	16 clusters - right putamen and the left insula.

=== Lindquist et al. 2012 ===
Lindquist, et al. reviewed 91 PET and fMRI studies published between January 1990 and December 2007. Induction methods were used to elicit fear, sadness, disgust, anger, and happiness. The goal was to compare basic emotions approaches with psychological constructionist approaches.

It was found that many brain regions activated consistently or selectively for one emotion category when experienced or perceived. As predicted by constructionist models, no region demonstrated functional specificity for fear, disgust, happiness, sadness, or anger.

The authors suggest that certain brain areas traditionally assigned to certain emotions are incorrect and instead correspond to different emotion categories. There is some evidence that the amygdala, anterior insula, and orbitofrontal cortex all contribute to "core affect", which are feelings of pleasure or discomfort.

Core affects
Region	Role
Amygdala	Identifying whether external sensory information is motivationally relevant, new, or evokes uncertainty
Anterior insula	Describes the core affective feelings, mostly driven by body sensations, across all emotion categories
Orbitofrontal cortex	Guides behavior by combining sensory information from the body and our environment

The anterior cingulate and the dorsolateral prefrontal cortex play a key role in attention, which is closely related to core affect. By using sensory information, the anterior cingulate directs attention and motor responses. According to psychological constructionist theory, emotions are conceptualizations connecting the world and the body, and the dorsolateral prefrontal cortex facilitates executive attention. As well as playing an active role in conceptualizing, the prefrontal cortex and hippocampus also simulate previous experiences. In several studies, the ventrolateral prefrontal cortex, which supports language, was consistently active during emotion perception and experience.

== See also ==
- Affective science
- Affective spectrum
- Affect (psychology)
- Endocrinology
- Experience machine
- Feeling
- Music therapy
- Neuroendocrinology
- Outline of brain mapping
- Outline of the human brain
- Psychiatry
- Psychophysiology
- S.M. (patient)
- Wirehead (science fiction)
