= Functional accounts of emotion =

A functional account of emotions posits that emotions facilitate adaptive responses to environmental challenges. In other words, emotions are systems that respond to environmental input, such as a social or physical challenge, and produce adaptive output, such as a particular behavior. Under such accounts, emotions can manifest in maladaptive feelings and behaviors, but they are largely beneficial insofar as they inform and prepare individuals to respond to environmental challenges, and play a crucial role in structuring social interactions and relationships.

Researchers who subscribe to a functional perspective of emotions disagree as to whether to define emotions and their respective functions in terms of evolutionary adaptation or in terms of socially constructed concepts. However, the goal of a functional account of emotions is to describe why humans have specific emotions, rather than to explain what exactly constitutes an emotion. Thus, functionalists generally agree that in order to infer the functions of specific emotions, researchers should examine the causes, or input, and consequences, or output, of those emotions.

The events that elicit specific emotions and the behavioral manifestations of those emotions can vary significantly based on individual and cultural context. Thus, researchers claim that a functional account of emotions should not be understood as a rigid input and output system, but rather as a flexible and dynamic system that interacts with an individual's goals, experiences, and environment to adaptively shape individuals’ emotional processing and responding.

== History ==
Historically, emotions were primarily understood and studied in terms of their maladaptive consequences. For example, Stoicism, an Ancient Greek tradition of philosophy, described how most emotions, particularly negative emotions like anger, are irrational and prevent people from achieving inner peace. Early psychologists followed this approach, often describing how emotions interfere with rational deliberation and can lead to reckless behaviors that risk well-being or relationships.

Around the 1960s, however, the focus of emotions research began shifting towards the beneficial consequences of emotions, and a growing body of psychological research contributed to understanding emotions as functional. For example, emotions structure relationships by facilitating bonding that promotes survival. Additionally, the expression of emotions can coordinate group behavior, thus promoting cooperation and collaboration. Interdisciplinary research in fields such as cultural psychology, sociology, and anthropology found that sociocultural norms often interact with and even emerge from individual and collective emotional experiences, providing further support for the role of emotions in organizing social life. While some researchers retained that emotions may have once been functional but are no longer necessary in the present environment, many researchers began to adopt the now-dominant view that emotions are systems that aim to provide solutions to problems in the present-day environment.

== Emotion functions ==
A functional account of any system assesses its specific function in terms of the factors that elicit the activation of that system, and the changes that follow the activation of that system. Importantly, not every cause and consequence of a system pertains to its primary function; the primary function is the specific purpose that the system fulfills. For example, tools have specific functions that are defined in terms of why the tool has certain features and the problem that it typically solves. So, while a pair of scissors can be used as a weapon, or a paper-weight, the sharp blades of scissors were designed to cut, and the problem that scissors typically solve is the need to cut something. Thus, the primary function of scissors is to cut.

Functional accounts of emotion similarly define the functions of specific emotions in terms of why those emotions are associated with certain features, such as particular bodily and cognitive changes, as well as the environmental problem that the emotion helps to solve. For example, why is anger typically associated with an increase in heart rate and the desire to approach the source of anger. When people become angry in response to an environmental problem, how does it help them change their environment in a way that benefits them? Emotion researchers attempt to answer such questions in relation to various prominent emotions, including negative emotions such as sadness, embarrassment, and fear, and positive emotions such as love, amusement, and awe. In order to identify the primary function of each emotion, researchers investigate its intrapersonal functions, or how emotions function at the level of the individual to help them navigate their surroundings, and interpersonal functions, or how emotions function at the group level to facilitate efficient communication, cooperation, and collaboration.

=== Intrapersonal functions ===
In investigating the intrapersonal functions of emotions, or how emotions help individuals navigate and respond to their environments, researchers typically document the physiological changes, subjective experiences, and behavioral motivations associated with different emotions. For example, anger is associated with high arousal, feelings of disapproval or dissatisfaction with some event, and the motivation to express that disapproval or take action against the source of dissatisfaction.

Given how emotional responses affect individual experience and behavior, researchers describe the intrapersonal function of specific emotions in terms of how they inform and prepare individuals to respond to a particular environmental challenge. For example, feeling anger usually informs individuals of something unjust in the environment, such as betrayal from a loved one, threats of physical violence from a bully, or corruption. Anger is associated with blood flow in the body shifting away from internal organs towards the limbs, physiologically preparing individuals for movement towards the cause of anger. Even when locomotion or physical confrontation is not required to address an unjust actor or event, the high arousal and emotional sensitivity associated with anger tend to motivate individuals to confront the issue. Emotional responses tend to diminish once the emotion elicitor, or the environmental cause of the emotion, changes, suggesting that emotions at the individual level function to evoke some sort of action or behavior to address the elicitor. For example, anger typically diminishes following an apology or the perception that justice has been restored.

=== Interpersonal functions ===
A crucial aspect of how emotions help individuals adaptively navigate the world is tied to their interpersonal functions, or how they influence social interactions and relationships. Emotional expressions, such as a smile or a frown, are relatively involuntary, so they can provide a fairly reliable source of information about a person's emotions, beliefs, and intentions to those around them. The communication of such information is crucial for structuring social relationships, and for negotiation and cooperation within groups, because it conveys not only how people are thinking and feeling, but also how they are likely to behave. This information can in turn guide how other people think, feel, and behave towards those expressing their emotions. For example, emotional expressions can evoke complementary emotional responses, such as fear in response to anger, or guilt in response to disappointment. They can also evoke reciprocal emotions, such as empathy or love. Thus, emotions play a crucial role in conveying valuable information in social interactions that can rapidly coordinate group behavior even in the absence of explicit verbal communication.

Given this communicative role of emotions, emotions facilitate learning by serving as incentives or deterrents for certain kinds of actions or behaviors. For example, when children see how their parents or friends emotionally respond to things they do, they learn what types of actions and behaviors are likely to lead to desirable outcomes, including positive emotional responses from those around them. This communicative role is important in informing how people behave in both professional and intimate adult human relationships as well, since emotions can convey how a particular relationship or interaction is evolving in positive or negative directions. For example, anger can signal that an individual or group has reached its limit within a negotiation, and can immediately structure the behavioral responses from the opposite party. Meanwhile, sadness can communicate the readiness to disengage from a goal, and the potential for social withdrawal from a person or group, thereby conveying that a potentially valuable relationship is at risk.

Emotions have also been found to play a role in organizing group identity insofar as shared emotional experiences tend to strengthen communal identity, in-group solidarity, and cultural identity. Furthermore, emotions play a role in defining and identifying an individual's role within a group, such that the specific role that an individual assumes (ex. nurturing, protecting, leading) is associated with the expression of particular emotions, such as sympathy, anger, fear, or embarrassment.

=== Negative and positive emotion ===
Researchers who adopt a functional perspective of emotions have devoted attention to several prevalent emotions. For example, research suggests that the function of anger is to correct injustice, the function of sadness is to disengage from an unattainable goal, the function of embarrassment is to appease others, and the function of fear is to avoid danger. The focus of emotions research for some time was on negative emotions, with positive emotions primarily being understood as “undoing” the arousing effects of negative emotion. In other words, while negative emotions increase arousal to help individuals address an environmental problem, positive emotions quell that arousal to return an individual to baseline.

While positive emotions can return individuals to baseline following a negative emotional experience, for example joy after an angering event has been addressed, or amusement that distracts from sadness, positive emotions themselves can increase arousal from baseline. Thus, a growing body of literature describes the distinct functions of positive emotions. For example, research suggests that the function of romantic love is to facilitate mating, the function of amusement is to facilitate play, which encourages learning, and the function of awe is to accommodate new information.

== Variability ==
Emotions are highly personal insofar as they play a critical role in defining an individual's subjective experiences and interact with how individuals think about and judge the world around them. Since individuals differ in their personal goals and past experiences, individuals within one society or group can vary greatly in how they experience and express specific emotions.

Emotions are also highly social insofar as they facilitate communication and often arise in response to the actions or feelings of other people. Given their highly social nature, the ways that emotions are experienced and expressed, and the specific roles that they play in structuring interactions and relationships, can vary significantly according to social and cultural context. For example, research investigating cultural differences in facial expressions found that East Asian models of anger show characteristic early signs of emotional intensity with the eyes, which are under less voluntary control than the mouth, as compared with Western Caucasian models. Such findings suggest that contextual factors such as a particular society's display rules may directly modulate both how an emotion is expressed, and how it is perceived and responded to by others. Furthermore, some emotions are generally experienced less in certain societies. For example, anger is not frequently reported amongst Utku Eskimos.

Given this immense variation in how individuals experience and express emotions, functionalists emphasize the dynamic quality of emotion systems. Under a functional account, emotion systems process feedback from the environment about when and how various emotions are likely to serve adaptive functions in a specific environment. In other words, emotion systems are flexible and can incorporate information that an individual learns across their lifespan to modify how the system operates. Furthermore, emotions interact with cognition such that how an individual learns and thinks about their own emotions can affect how they experience and express emotions.

== Relation to mental illness ==
There are cases when an emotion, for example a constantly excessive level of anxiety, actually inhibits life functions rather than facilitating them. This is sometimes regarded as part of a mental illness.

Within psychiatry, evolutionary accounts apply functional reasoning to clinical phenomena, proposing that capacities for emotions like anxiety and low mood are generally useful defenses that can become dysregulated or context‑insensitive. Reviews in evolutionary psychiatry argue that such explanations complement mechanistic accounts by addressing why vulnerability to certain symptoms persists and why defensive responses may "misfire" in modern environments.
