= Erroll Bedford =

Erroll Bedford was an English philosopher notable for his work on emotions. Bedford thinks emotions refer to behavior, rather than feelings.
