= Affective science =

Study of emotion or feeling of emotion

Affective science is the scientific study of emotion or affect. This includes the study of emotion elicitation, emotional experience and the recognition of emotions in others. Of particular relevance are the nature of feeling, mood, emotionally driven behavior, decision-making, attention and self-regulation, as well as the underlying physiology and neuroscience of the emotions.

== Discussion ==
An increasing interest in emotion can be seen in the behavioral, biological and social sciences. Research over the last two decades suggests that many phenomena, ranging from individual cognitive processing to social and collective behavior, cannot be understood without taking into account affective determinants (i.e. motives, attitudes, moods, and emotions). Just as the cognitive revolution of the 1960s spawned the cognitive sciences and linked the disciplines studying cognitive functioning from different vantage points, the emerging field of affective science seeks to bring together the disciplines which study the biological, psychological, and social dimensions of affect. In particular affective science includes psychology, affective neuroscience, sociology, psychiatry, anthropology, ethology, archaeology, economics, criminology, law, political science, history, geography, education and linguistics. Research is also informed by contemporary philosophical analysis and artistic explorations of emotions. Emotions developed in human history cause organisms to react to environmental stimuli and challenges.

The major challenge for this interdisciplinary domain is to integrate research focusing on the same phenomenon, emotion and similar affective processes, starting from different perspectives, theoretical backgrounds, and levels of analysis. As a result, one of the first challenges of affective science is to reach consensus on the definition of emotions. Discussion is ongoing as to whether emotions are primarily bodily responses or whether cognitive processing is central. Controversy also concerns the most effective ways to measure emotions and conceptualise how one emotion differs from another. Examples of this include the dimensional models of Russell and others, Plutchik's wheel of emotions, and the general distinction between basic and complex emotions.

== Measuring emotions ==
Whether scientific method is at all suited for the study of the subjective aspect of emotion, feelings, is a question for philosophy of science and epistemology. In practice, the use of self-report (i.e. questionnaires) has been widely adopted by researchers. Additionally, web-based research is being used to conduct large-scale studies on the components of happiness for example.) Nevertheless, Seligman mentions in the book the poor reliability of using this method as it is often entirely subjective to how the individual is feeling at the time, as opposed to questionnaires which test for more long standing personal features that contribute to well-being such as meaning in life. Alongside this researchers also use functional magnetic resonance imaging and physiological measures of skin conductance, muscle tension and hormone secretion. There are also a few systems available that claim to measure emotions, for instance using automated video analysis or skin conductance. Moreover, emotional AI has been used to analyze and detect emotional states.

=== Affective display ===
A common way to measure the emotions of others is via their emotional expressions. These include facial expression, vocal expression and bodily posture. Much work has also gone into coding expressive behavior computer programmes that can be used to read the subject's emotion more reliably. The model used for facial expression is the Facial Action Coding System or 'FACS'. An influential figure in the development of this system was Paul Ekman. For criticism, see the conceptual-act model of emotion.

These behavioral sources can be contrasted with language descriptive of emotions. In both respects one may observe the way that affective display differs from culture to culture.

== Relevant institutions ==
One of the research institutions in the field of affective science is Stanford University. It emphasizes basic research on emotion, culture, and psychopathology using a broad range of experimental, psychophysiological, neural, and genetic methods to test theory about psychological mechanisms underlying human behavior. Topics include longevity, culture and emotion, reward processing, depression, social anxiety, risk for psychopathology, and emotion expression, suppression, and dysregulation.

== See also ==
- Emotion
- Music therapy
- Psychology
- Affective neuroscience
- Affective computing
- Affect (psychology)
