= Emotional climate =

Emotional climate is a concept that quantifies the “climate” of a community, being a small group, a classroom, an organization, or a geographical region. It refers to the emotional relationships among members of a community and describes the overall emotional environment within a specific context.

== Definition ==
Emotional climates indicate the emotional relationships interwoven among members of a community and describe the quality of the environment within a particular context. Emotional climates reflect the way most members of a community feel in a given situation; it can be defined as how members of a group perceive the feelings of the majority of its members in the specific situation or environment of the group. The emotional climate can also be defined as a relatively enduring set of characteristics (or attributes) of a particular social environment that is experienced by the group members and that influences their behavior.

== Description ==
The concept of emotional climate was first used in educational psychology to define the effects of classroom climates on learning, but it has since been adopted and extensively used in work and organizational psychology to capture differences in work environments. Emotional climates affect individual motivation, levels of satisfaction, attitudes, expectations, and behavior in a given context (e.g., a firm, or a classroom). Negative emotional climates may exacerbate depressive symptoms and discourage personal growth, while positive emotional climates stimulate creativity, growth, and professional development. In the framework of an organization, the emotional climate appears to be a significant contributor to overall staff morale, performance, and productivity.

According to Joseph De Rivera and Dario Páez emotional climates can either arise in reaction to specific collective experiences (e.g., a natural disaster) or be constructed through people's ordinary behavior and everyday interactions. People talk to each other about their feelings and their complaints, influence one another, and thus construct shared emotional patterns. Bernard Rimé argues that intense emotions, such as joy, anger, sadness, and shame, are commonly shared among individuals. These states influence people's lives, even for extended periods of time, and propagate throughout the social environment.

Emotional climates are often labeled by using names of emotions, such as joy, anger, and fear. However, they can also be labeled making direct reference to the emotional relationships that are involved, such as hostility or solidarity.

== Emotional atmosphere and culture ==
Joseph De Rivera distinguishes between emotional atmosphere (collective mood) and emotional climate. Emotional atmosphere refers to the collective behavior that a community may manifest when it is focused on a common event, emotional climate identifies instead the emotional relationships between the members of the society. He also argues that when certain emotional relationships, such as hostility and solidarity, but also joy or fear, become transmitted from generation to generation and depict stable features of a society or community, they can be referred to as emotional culture.

== Determinants of a good emotional climate ==
Concepts such as emotional competence, emotional agency, and work engagement are distinct, yet close concepts to the emotional climate. All of these factors are likely to have a two-way interaction with each other.

Beliefs in one’s own capabilities may result in individuals using their emotional abilities to build a collective emotional climate. Therefore, simply having emotional competence or intelligence isn't enough, one needs to feel confident in their abilities and actually use these skills in order to create a good emotional climate. Indeed, based on the study by Hökkä et al. (2022), influencing emotions at work (an aspect of emotional agency) is a more significant determinant of the emotional climate than for example emotional competence at work. Embedding emotional competence or emotional agency within workplace practices can link increased emotional abilities to actual routines and practices.

== General effects ==
Emotions have a crucial impact on our well-being and performance. Emotions at work for example affect performance, motivation, social interactions, decision-making, turnover intentions, negotiation and conflict resolution, group dynamics, and effective leadership.

== Emotional climates and the life course ==
According to the life course approach, individual life courses and trajectories do not develop in an empty space but they are nested into a wider social and historical context at the point that ignoring such context would lead to partial and sometimes misleading interpretations of social phenomena. Hence, emotional climates influence the life course, affecting individual emotions and perceptions, and potentially their social behavior and life choices. Research by Davide Morselli shows that emotional climates of relatively large communities (regions, cantons) are tangled with other socioeconomic factors, such as wealth and unemployment rate, and influence individual emotional responses to life events.

== See also ==
- Classroom climate
- Leadership climate
- Emotions
