= Classroom climate =

Physical, emotional and social aspects of a classroom environment

Classroom climate is the classroom environment, the social climate, the emotional and the physical aspects of the classroom. It's the idea that teachers influence student growth and behavior. The student's behavior affects peer interaction—the responsibility of influencing these behaviors is placed with the Instructor. The way the instructor organizes the classroom should lead to a positive environment rather than a destructive and/or an environment that is not conducive to learning. Dr. Karen L. Bierman, the Director of the PennState Child Study Center and Professor of Psychology, believed that a teacher needs to be "invisible hand" in the classroom.

== Purpose of a positive classroom climate ==
Teachers should learn to guide their students, not to alienate them. The safety of the student's well-being is paramount in their development of social ties with peers and their instructor. As education becomes more inclusive, teachers need to become more aware of how to organize groups of students and how the students are arranged can lead to a favorable environment. Well-organized classrooms are an important component to classroom functions as it leads to more dialogue and formative assessment. Students with special education needs (SEN) tend to feel more excluded from the other students in the classroom. SEN students include those with behavioral problems and those with learning difficulties. Students who do not have disadvantages are more inclined to participate as they feel more like they belong and have a higher belief in their academic abilities. Education becomes less of a chore and more enjoyable when students grow as a group which can lead to the reduction of students acting out destructively. In order to affect students, a teacher needs to monitor and modify the influence students have on one another. Teachers are able to help students feel included by assigning groups and rearranging the seating chart so less cliques are formed in the classroom. Combating bad behavior is a teacher's duty. Teachers need not only to take into consideration how the classroom is arranged, but also observe students' background, family life, grade, and many other complex issues surrounding life.

=== Disinterest in use in the classroom ===
Mara W. Allodi, Department of Special Education, Stockholm University's article The Meaning of Social Climate of Learning Environments: Some Reasons Why We Do Not Care Enough About It, discusses the idea that social competence is as important to learning as the curriculum. Teaching has become more bureaucratic in the distribution of curriculum, its organization, and the system has turned it into more of a competition for high grades and less about human emotion. People often forget the importance of self-esteem and stress; these affect student interaction and learning. It is two-fold: one separates knowledge from the social climate. Classroom climate is not associated with learning.

=== Technology in the Classroom ===
The increased use of technology can lead to the replacement of teachers which would completely remove any social aspect of a classroom climate as the students would be learning from a robot or a machine and would not have that teacher student connection that is essential. "Oral Presentations and group collaborations, students will learn to be dynamic in how they learn and interact with others." As well, "Without a classroom where students can form friendships and relationships with their peers, they may not learn the same social cues as regular students. Without any real face-to-face time with their teacher, they may take the classes less seriously."

== See also ==
- Emotional climate
- Leadership climate
