= Theory of constructed emotion =

Scientific theory

The theory of constructed emotion (formerly the conceptual act model of emotion) is a theory in affective science proposed by Lisa Feldman Barrett to explain the experience and perception of emotion. The theory posits that instances of emotion are constructed predictively by the brain in the moment as needed. It draws from social construction, psychological construction, and neuroconstruction.

== Motivation ==
Barrett proposed the theory to resolve what she calls the "emotion paradox," which she claims has perplexed emotion researchers for decades, and describes as follows: People have vivid and intense experiences of emotion in day-to-day life: they report seeing emotions like "anger", "sadness", and "happiness" in others, and they report experiencing "anger", "sadness" and so on themselves. Nevertheless, psychophysiological and neuroscientific evidence has failed to yield consistent support for the existence of such discrete categories of experience. Instead, the empirical evidence suggests that what exists in the brain and body is affect, and emotions are constructed by multiple brain networks working in tandem.

Most other theories of emotion assume that emotions are genetically endowed, not learned. Other scientists believe there are circuits in the brain: an anger circuit, a fear circuit, and so on. Charles Darwin, in The Expression of the Emotions in Man and Animals, used examples to support the idea that emotions and their "expressions are a universal part of human nature", and that people can recognize and express emotions without any training.

The theory of constructed emotion calls this assumption into question. It suggests that these emotions (often called "basic emotions") are not biologically hardwired, but instead are phenomena that emerge in consciousness "in the moment" from more fundamental ingredients.

== Statement of the theory ==
The theory is given in simplified form as:

"In every waking moment, your brain uses past experience, organized as concepts, to guide your actions and give your sensations meaning. When the concepts involved are emotion concepts, your brain constructs instances of emotion."

In greater detail, instances of emotion are constructed throughout the entire brain by multiple brain networks in collaboration. Ingredients going into this construction include interoception, concepts, and social reality. Interoceptive predictions provide information about the state of the body and ultimately produce basic, affective feelings of pleasure, displeasure, arousal, and calmness. Concepts are culturally embodied knowledge, including "emotion concepts". Social reality provides the collective agreement and language that make the perception of emotion possible among people who share a culture.

As an analogy, consider the experience of color. People experience colors as discrete categories: blue, red, yellow, and so on, and these categories vary in different cultures. The physics of color, however, is actually continuous, with wavelengths measured in nanometers along a scale from ultraviolet to infrared. When a person experiences an object as "blue", she is (unconsciously) using her color concepts to categorize this wavelength. And in fact, people experience a whole range of wavelengths as "blue."

Likewise, emotions are commonly thought of as discrete and distinct — fear, anger, happiness — while affect (produced by interoception) is continuous. The theory of constructed emotion suggests that at a given moment, the brain predicts and categorizes the present moment (of continuous affect) via interoceptive predictions and the "emotion concepts" from one's culture, to construct an instance of emotion, just as one perceives discrete colors. This process instantiates the experience of "having an emotion".

For example, if someone's brain predicts the presence of a snake as well as the unpleasant affect that would result upon encountering a snake ("interoceptive prediction"), that brain might categorize and construct an experience of "fear." This process takes place before any actual sensory input of a snake reaches conscious awareness. In contrast, a "basic emotions" researcher would say that the person first sees the snake, and this sensory input triggers a dedicated "fear circuit" in the brain.

=== Earlier incarnations of the theory ===
Early incarnations of the theory were phrased in terms of core affect rather than interoception. Core affect is a neurophysiological state characterized along two dimensions:

- Pleasure vs. displeasure, measured along a continuous scale from positive to negative.
- High arousal vs. low arousal, measured along a continuous scale between these endpoints.

According to the original conceptual act model, emotion is generated when a person categorizes his/her core affective state using knowledge about emotion. This theory combines elements of linguistic relativity and affective neuroscience.

The term "core affect" was first used in print by Russell and Barrett in 1999 in Journal of Personality and Social Psychology where it is used to refer to the affective feelings that are part of every conscious state (as discussed by Wundt in his 1889 System der Philosophie). The term "core affect" also appears to have been used as a phrase that relates to neuropsychological understanding of behavior as a morbid affect at the roots of any type of human behavior.

== Other researchers ==
Joseph LeDoux has reached similar views.

The theory denies "essentialism" of brain areas exclusively dedicated to emotion, such as the seven primary affective systems proposed by the affective neuroscientist Jaak Panksepp. (Note that Barrett and Panksepp use the word "affect" to mean different things. Barrett defines affect as a basic feature of consciousness, akin to light and dark or loudness and softness, consisting of a combination of valence and arousal, consistent with the original definition of affect by Wilhelm Wundt. Panksepp uses the term in the plural, "affects," to refer to his proposed seven systems.) Panksepp characterized the theory of constructed emotion as an "attributional–dimensional constructivist view of human emotions [which] postulates that positive and negative core affects are the basic feelings—the primary processes—from which emotional concepts are cognitively and socially constructed". (Since the theory of constructed emotion is not about core affect, this statement likely refers to Barrett's older conceptual act theory.)
