= Emotion Review =

Academic journal

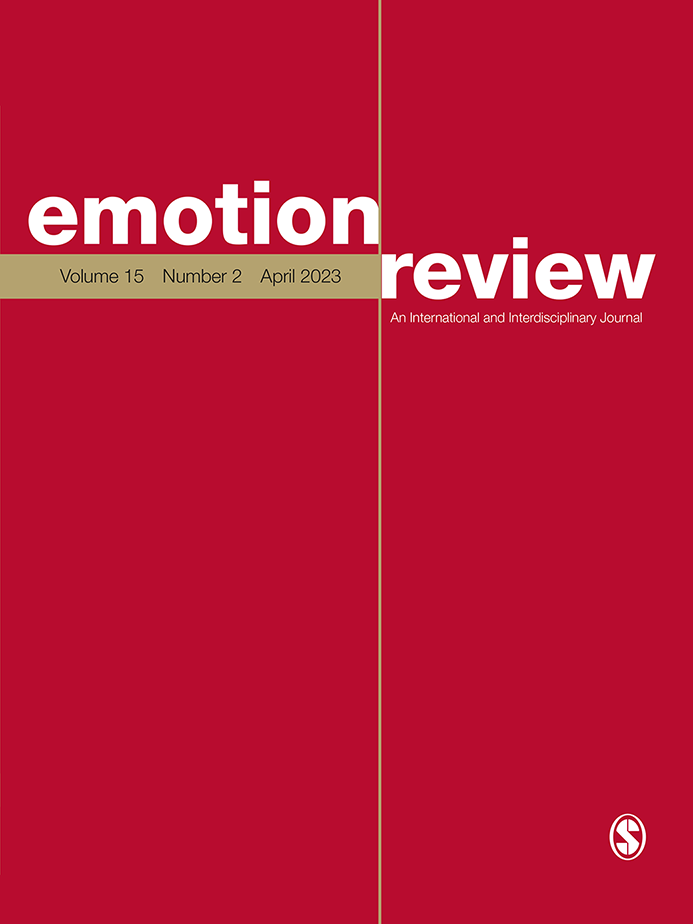
- Discipline: Interdisciplinary
- Language: English
- Edited by: W. Gerrod Parrott

Publication details
- Publisher: Sage Publications, International Society for Research on Emotions (United States)
- Frequency: Quarterly

Standard abbreviations
- ISO 4: Emot. Rev.

Indexing
- ISSN: 1754-0739 (print); 1754-0747 (web)
- LCCN: 2009210521
- OCLC no.: 310391512

Links
- Journal homepage

Emotion Review is a peer-reviewed scholarly journal published by Sage Publications in association with the International Society for Research on Emotions (ISRE). The editor is W. Gerrod Parrott of Georgetown University.

It is indexed in the Social Sciences Citation Index, Journal Citation Reports, and Current Contents.

== Overview ==
Emotion Review publishes articles covering the whole spectrum of emotions research. It is an interdisciplinary journal publishing work in anthropology, biology, computer science, economics, history, humanities, linguistics, neuroscience, philosophy, physiology, political science, psychiatry, psychology, sociology, and in other areas where emotion research is active.

== Focus ==
The journal focuses on a combination of theoretical, conceptual, and review papers. It allows commentaries given its aim to enhance debate about critical issues in emotion theory and research. Articles do not include reports of empirical studies.
