= Fear-potentiated startle =

Reflexive physiological reaction

Fear-potentiated startle (FPS) is a reflexive physiological reaction to a presented stimulus, and is an indicator of the fear reaction in an organism. The FPS response can be elicited in the face of any threatening stimulus (e.g., any object, person or situation that would cause someone to experience feelings of fear), but it can also be elicited by a neutral stimulus as a result of fear conditioning, a process that occurs when a benign stimulus comes to evoke fear and anxiety upon being paired with a traumatic or fear-provoking event. The stimulus in question is usually of auditory (e.g., loud noise) or visual (e.g., bright light) nature, and startle response measures include eyeblink rates and pulse/heart rate. The negative impact of heightened FPS in the face of neutral stimuli can be treated pharmacologically, using psychotropic medications that are typically used to reduce anxiety in humans. Recent literature, moreover, has implicated increased FPS responses as a correlate in posttraumatic stress disorder (PTSD) and other anxiety disorders.

== Neurobiology of FPS ==
The central brain structure through which fear-associated responses are mediated has been determined to be the amygdala, which is located in the brain's temporal lobe. When the central nucleus of the amygdala is stimulated - what is popularly referred to as the "fight-or-flight" response is activated - the organism in question reacts passively (is rendered frozen in its tracks, becomes hyper-vigilantly attentive, etc.), or displays a physiological reaction geared toward facilitating an aggressive reaction (e.g., increased heart-rate/pulse, rapid breathing). These fear-induced reactions result from communication between the amygdala and a variety of other brain regions (such as the brain stem and hypothalamus), resulting in a variety of physiological responses in the organism. For instance, communication between an activated amygdala and the lateral hypothalamus results in increased blood pressure and dilation of the pupils; the initiation of the central grey via communication from the amygdala results in the organism's becoming frozen in its tracks; communication between the activated amygdala and the paraventricular nucleus of the hypothalamus releases hormones associated with stress.

Literature has linked the FPS response to interplay between the central nucleus of the amygdala and both the central grey and nucleus reticular pontis caudalis. Insult (e.g., traumatic brain injury) to these brain areas inhibits any display of FPS response in humans. In addition, a distinction has been made concerning neural activity of the reflexive FPS response, and that which occurs in the face of exposure to a fear-inducing stimulus over a long period of time, such as abuse or combat or to a place or situation. Literature suggests that, in such situations, FPS is caused by activation of the bed nucleus of the stria terminals. Insult to this brain region inhibiting FPS response in the face of longitudinally conditioned or situation/location-related threatening stimuli in rats. The extinction of heightened FPS response to stimuli previously conditioned to be threatening has been linked to activity in the medial prefrontal cortex.

== Measuring the startle response and utilization of FPS data ==
The most common physiological response measured to gauge FPS response in humans is eyeblink, or the reflexive act of blinking. Currently, the most widely accepted/used means with which to measure the eyeblink reflex is by using a technology called electromyographic recording (EMG). EMG provides eyeblink rate data by measuring and recording activity of the eyelid muscles using two electrodes. In order to obtain an optimal reading, the person's skin must be cleaned, dried, and covered with a thin layer of electrode gel in only the spots where the measures will be taken; one electrode is placed in the center of the person's forehead above the nose, and two recording electrodes are placed directly underneath the eye, approximately two centimeters apart. The participant should be looking forward for the duration of data collection. If noises are used as the catalyst for the FPS response in a study (acoustic startle), the volume must be both controlled and reported, as noises around 50/60 Hz can compromise the accuracy of the recordings taken by the EMG.

Specifically measuring FPS response in studies of fear is highly practical, as the experimental and baseline measures of an individual's startle response can be partitioned, and variance in startle can, in turn, be attributed to fear (or lack thereof, in the case that extinction of fear is variable of interest), allowing illusory correlates (other variables that can also appear to cause an effect on our variable of interest) to be ruled out. There are several experimental climates that can be used to examine the FPS response. Eyeblink FPS response is typically gauged by presenting participants with pleasant and unpleasant (as well as neutral) emotionally evocative stimuli, paired with a loud noise or a flash of bright lights. The presented stimuli can be replaced by having participants imagine emotionally evocative stimuli of pleasant, unpleasant, and neutral natures. FPS response is typically most exaggerated in response to emotionally unpleasant stimuli, followed by pleasant and then neutral stimuli, in members of the general population.

In addition, FPS response in research concerning fear conditioning (and extinction of a conditioned aversion to a previously neutral stimulus) is also commonly examined; such studies will present noise or light startle probes with unpleasant stimuli to condition the FPS to occur in the presence of that stimuli. Measurements of FPS response in response to both the conditioned stimuli and the neutral stimuli (in the absence of light or sound probes) are then taken, with the measured difference in the size of startle response being the variable of interest, as this difference score indicates alteration of naturally occurring and conditioned FPS response. Resulting data from such studies can be used to examine both FPS response in light of conditioned fear, and an individual's ability to break the conditioned fear reactions (extinction).

== FPS and posttraumatic stress disorder ==
A heightened (or abnormally overactive) startle response in the face of benign stimuli/settings is often seen in individuals suffering from posttraumatic stress disorder (PTSD), a psychological ailment characterized by maladaptive and inappropriate affective and physiological reactions to stimuli that can be associated with a previously experienced trauma. For instance, combat veterans often experience psychological and physiological panic / anxiety / dissociative "flashbacks" to the traumatic experience that triggered the PTSD pathology in reaction to unexpected loud noises, a stimulus that can remind the individual of gunshots, bombs, or exploding grenades.

Individuals with PTSD have been shown to have an increased FPS response, and data have also suggested that this response becomes further exaggerated when these individuals experience stress. People having been diagnosed with PTSD display similar FPS response to threatening and neutral stimuli, indicating that (unlike those not suffering from PTSD) these individuals have difficulty distinguishing a stimulus as posing a threat or being benign. Additionally, data has displayed a significantly reduced ability for the extinction of conditioned fear responses in combat Veterans with severe, chronic PTSD The reduced ability for fear extinction over longer periods of time in combat veterans, as a result of the pathology associated with PTSD, has also been asserted.

Heightened FPS response has also been implicated in the following disorders, falling under the current DSM-IV-TR classification of anxiety disorders: phobia (social and specific) and obsessive-compulsive disorder. On the converse, mood disorders such as depression have been shown to cause weakened FPS responses in diagnosed individuals.

== Treatment options ==
As exaggerated FPS responses can lend to the pathology associated with PTSD and other disorders of the anxiety disorder classification, decreasing the startle response in humans may be of benefit in the treatment of these psychological disorders. Several forms of medication acting on different neurotransmitters (e.g., GABA, dopamine) in the brain have been shown to cause significant reductions in startle response; the medications that are effective in treating conditioned fear are those typically used in the treatment of anxiety.
