= Amusement =

Positive emotion related to humor

Amusement is the state of experiencing humorous and entertaining events or situations while the person or animal actively maintains the experience, and is associated with enjoyment, happiness, laughter and pleasure. It is an emotion with positive valence and high physiological arousal.

Amusement is considered an "epistemological" emotion because humor occurs when one experiences a cognitive shift from one knowledge structure about a target to another, such as hearing the punchline of a joke. Emotions perceived overtime are focused on the daily dynamics of life as augment or blunt. The pleasant surprise that happens from learning this new information leads to a state of amusement which people often express through smiling, laughter or chuckling.

Current studies have not yet reached consensus on the exact purpose of amusement, though theories have been advanced in the fields of psychology, psychiatry, and sociology. In addition, the precise mechanism that causes a given element (image, sound, behavior, etc.) to be perceived as more or less 'amusing' than another similar element to a particular individual is not clearly understood.

== Theories ==
Two different theoretical perspectives about emotion provide contrasting origins of amusement:

=== Evolutionary ===
The evolutionary perspective proposes that amusement is a distinct emotion that evolved to enhance a species’ survival. Collective laughter helps define an ingroup, helping people recognize those similar to them and feel included. It also helps identify outgroup members and enhance the barrier between the two. Laughter can provide network support as encouragement, or it can inform ingroup members that they are losing majority favor and to adjust their behavior to reassimilate.

=== Constructed emotion ===
The theory of constructed emotion suggests that when humans have a positive experience that increases their arousal, such as a faster heartbeat and increased sweat production, they cognitively seek out a label for that feeling. They will land on amusement if that experience resembles other amusement experiences they have had.

== Emotional expression of amusement ==
The origin of the study of emotional expression is often attributed to Charles Darwin. In 1872, Darwin published his book The Expression of the Emotions in Man and Animals, in which he extensively describes his observations of how people and animals display emotions on their faces and through sound. Darwin comments on amusement as an emotion of great joy during which a person is likely to laugh. He also notes that across all peoples humans can laugh until they are panting and tears roll down their cheeks. In the 1960s, Paul Ekman, an American psychologist, revived the study of emotional expression, proposing, like Darwin, that emotions were universally recognizable. His early work focused on six basic emotions: happiness, anger, sadness, fear, disgust, and surprise. By the 1990s, Ekman had expanded this list to include several additional emotions, one of which was amusement.

Displays of amusement have been distinguished from related emotions like embarrassment and shame. More recent studies have confirmed that laughter is a distinct signal of amusement and is recognizable across cultures.

=== Facial expression ===
An amused facial expression typically has these characteristics:

- Head: Thrown back with jaw lifted
- Eyes: Crow's feet at the eyes indicating that the muscles have tightened
- Mouth: Open, jaw dropped with relaxed muscles

=== Vocal burst ===
The expression of amusement is usually accompanied by genuine laughter. The experience of laughter changes the breathing pattern and often causes all the muscles to relax.

== Cultural considerations ==
As a positive, high arousal emotion, amusement falls in the same category as excitement and exhilaration. These emotions are highly valued in American culture where positive feelings that high in energy are seen as ideal. In contrast, East Asian cultures value positive, low arousal emotions such as contentment, calm and peacefulness.

== Clinical uses ==
=== Emotion regulation ===
Emotion regulation is the term for how people attempt to influence - increasing, decreasing, maintaining, or changing - how, when, and where they experience emotion. Through changing how they think about a target of amusement, like a humorous video clip, people are able to increase and decrease how much amusement they feel, express in smiles and laughs, and experience in their bodies (e.g. increased heart rate and respiration). Choosing to increase or prolong experiences of positive emotion is one way in which people can learn to cope when faced with challenges and develop resilience.

=== Resilience ===
As a positive emotion, amusement contributes to the development of resilience in both children and adults. Positive emotions help people build social resources that foster their ability to cope during hard times. Increases in resilience lead to higher life satisfaction and general happiness.

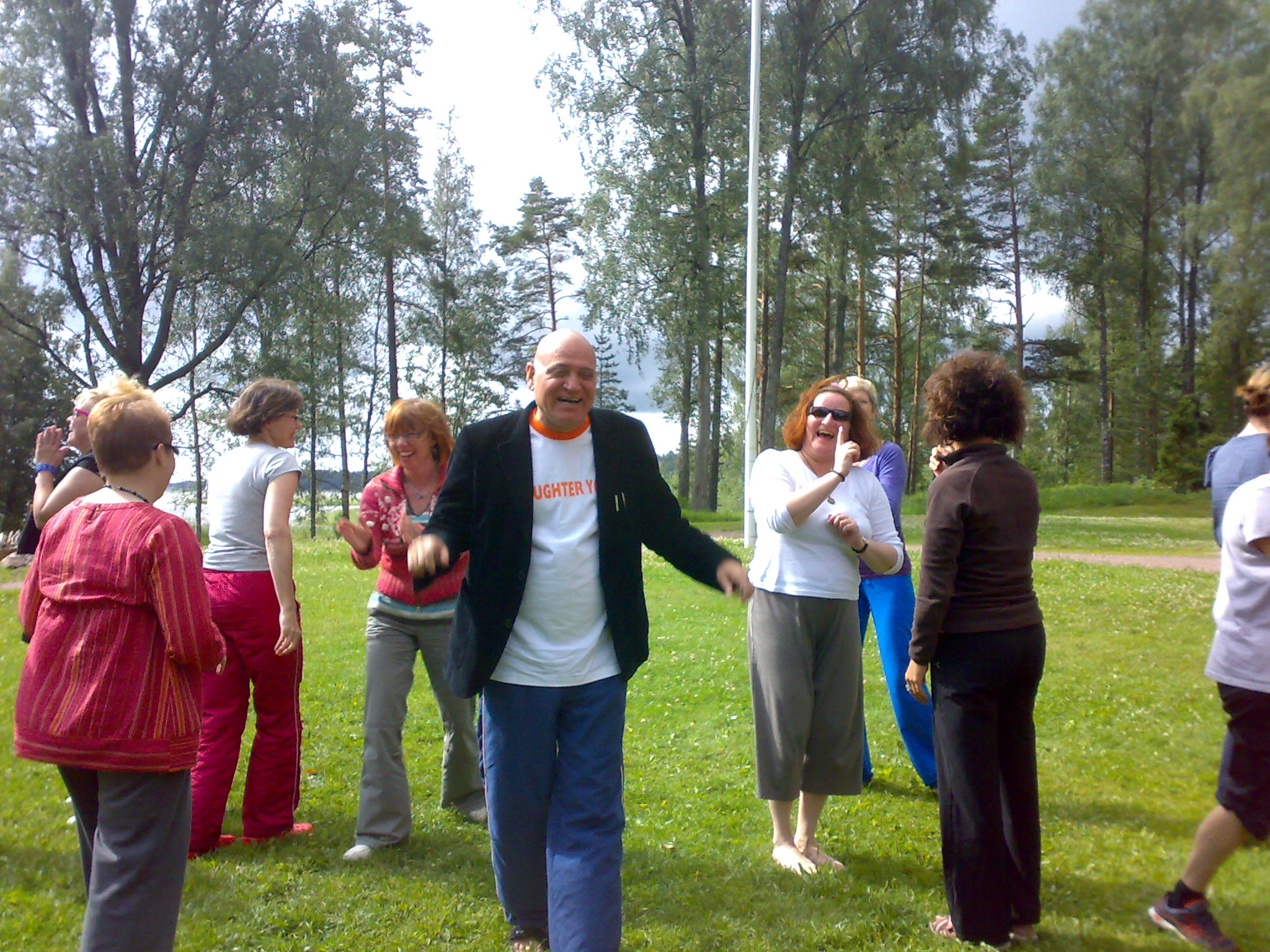
People engaging in laughter therapy

=== Laughter therapy ===
Rapidly growing in popularity, laughter therapy, or humor therapy, focuses on promoting laughter as a therapeutic tool. Usually implemented in a group, laughter therapy uses a variety of gag jokes like red noses and magic tricks to encourage laughter - fake or real. Laughter causes the body's muscles to relax which increases blood flow and oxygen intake. Proposed benefits include stress management, relaxation, improved mental functions, improved digestion, and pain relief. Some suggest that laughter activates similar brain wave frequencies to a meditative state. However, scientific studies of these benefits are limited and have methodological issues.

== See also ==
- Leisure
- Recreation
