= Feeling =

Conscious subjective experience of emotion

According to the APA Dictionary of Psychology, a feeling is "a self-contained phenomenal experience"; feelings are "subjective, evaluative, and independent of the sensations, thoughts, or images evoking them". The term feeling is closely related to, but not the same as, emotion. Feeling may, for instance, refer to the conscious subjective experience of emotions. The study of subjective experiences is called phenomenology. Psychotherapy generally involves a therapist helping a client understand, articulate, and learn to effectively regulate the client's own feelings, and ultimately to take responsibility for the client's experience of the world. Feelings are sometimes held to be characteristic of embodied consciousness.

The English noun feelings may generally refer to any degree of subjectivity in perception or sensation. However, feelings often refer to an individual sense of well-being (perhaps of wholeness, safety, or being loved). Feelings have a semantic field extending from the individual and spiritual to the social and political. The word feeling may refer to any of a number of psychological characteristics of experience, or even to reflect the entire inner life of the individual (see mood). As self-contained phenomenal experiences, evoked by sensations and perceptions, feelings can strongly influence the character of a person's subjective reality. Feelings can sometimes harbor bias or otherwise distort veridical perception, in particular through projection, wishful thinking, among many other such effects.

Feeling may also describe the senses, such as the physical sensation of touch.

== Definitions and distinctions ==
In psychology and philosophy, feeling is commonly defined as the subjective experience of emotion or sensation. Although the terms feeling, emotion, affect, and mood are sometimes used interchangeably in everyday language, they have distinct meanings in academic contexts.

According to psychologist Carroll Izard, feelings are best understood as the conscious experience of emotion, arising when an affective state reaches awareness. William James similarly proposed that feelings result from the perception of bodily changes in response to external stimuli, thus forming part of the emotional process. More recently, affective neuroscientist Jaak Panksepp hypothesized the role of subcortical brain systems in generating core affects that underlie both feelings and emotions.

Lisa Feldman Barrett argues that affect is most likely innate in mammals (and possibly all vertebrates), whereas emotions are constructed mental representations that emerge from the brain's interpretation of interoceptive prediction signals combined with past experience (organized as concepts) and signals from the outside world. In philosophical psychology, particularly in the work of Carl Jung, feeling is considered one of the four primary functions of consciousness, alongside thinking, sensation, and intuition. Unlike emotions, which are often reactive, Jung defined feeling as a rational function that evaluates and assigns value.

Feeling also differs from sensation: while sensation refers to raw sensory input (such as touch, heat, or pain), feelings involve evaluative or affective judgements about those sensations or experiences. Similarly, moods are typically more diffuse and long-lasting affective states, while feelings tend to be more transient and directly tied to particular events or thoughts. These distinctions are foundational in fields such as affective science, philosophy of mind, and cognitive psychology, where the term feeling plays a central role in understanding consciousness, subjectivity, and emotional life.

Neuroscientist Antonio Damasio distinguishes between emotions and feelings: Emotions are mental images (i.e. representing either internal or external states of reality) and the bodily changes accompanying them, whereas feelings are the perception of bodily changes. In other words, emotions contain a subjective element and a third-person observable element, whereas feelings are subjective and private.

== Historical and philosophical views ==
The English word feeling derives from Old English fēlan, meaning "to touch or perceive through the senses", and later acquired the meaning of internal emotional experience. Early philosophical and psychological approaches to feeling laid the foundation for later distinctions between affect, emotion, and cognition. These perspectives treated feeling not merely as emotional fluctuation but as a central dimension of human experience, evaluative thought, and even moral judgement.

The systematic study of affect and feeling (gefühl) (Note: In German psychology, the term gefühl (meaning "feeling") has long been used to refer to subjective emotional experience, and it continues to play a role in German-language affective science and phenomenology.) in psychology began in the late 19th century with the work of Wilhelm Wundt, often considered the founder of experimental psychology. Wundt proposed that affective experience could be described along three dimensions: pleasant–unpleasant, arousing–subduing, and strain–relaxation. These affective dimensions laid the groundwork for later theories of emotional valence and arousal.

A decade later, William James proposed a physiological theory of emotion in which feelings are the perception of bodily changes caused by external stimuli. In his classic 1884 essay, he wrote: "we feel sorry because we cry, angry because we strike, afraid because we tremble", arguing that feeling follows bodily reaction rather than preceding it.

In the early 20th century, Carl Jung developed a typology in which feeling was one of the four fundamental functions of consciousness, alongside thinking, sensation, and intuition. Unlike emotion, which he considered reactive and affective, Jung defined feeling as a rational function that judges and evaluates rather than perceives or reacts. In this view, feeling can be used to assign value or make decisions, independent of sensory experience.

Meanwhile, in phenomenological philosophy, Max Scheler emphasized that feeling is a unique mode of access to values. Rather than viewing feelings as subjective or irrational, Scheler argued that they are intentional acts that disclose the worth of things—what he called "value-feelings" (wertgefühle). This idea positioned feeling not only as affective but also as epistemological.

Contemporary philosopher Martha Nussbaum has continued the philosophical development of feeling by arguing that emotions are a form of evaluative judgement. Drawing from classical philosophy, she suggests that emotions are not opposed to rationality but are instead shaped by beliefs about what is valuable and significant. In her account, feelings are deeply intertwined with ethical reasoning and human flourishing.

== Cross-cultural and contemplative views ==
Conceptions of feeling vary widely across cultures and philosophical traditions. In many non-Western frameworks, feeling is not merely a passive or internal state, but a central mode of perceiving, valuing, and engaging with the world.

In Buddhist psychology, particularly in the Abhidharma and Mahayana traditions, feelings (Sanskrit: vedanā) are classified into three primary types: pleasant, unpleasant, and neutral. These are not emotions per se, but rather the basic hedonic tone that arises with every moment of experience. The recognition and mindfulness of feeling tones is foundational in the Satipatthana system of meditation, particularly in the practice of vedanānupassanā—the contemplation of feelings as transient phenomena.

In Tibetan Buddhist systems, these basic feeling tones are further elaborated into a structured typology known as the 51 mental factors, which include both innate and cultivated emotional and cognitive states. Feeling in this context is interwoven with attentional processes, ethical evaluation, and the potential for insight. These frameworks regard feeling as a dynamic event in the continuum of mind, with implications for both enlightenment and suffering.

Hindu philosophy, particularly in the context of rasa theory, offers another model in which feelings are treated not as inner states alone but as aesthetic-emotional essences (rasa) that are evoked and shared through performance, poetry, and religious experience. Classical Indian aesthetics identifies nine primary rasas, such as love (śṛṅgāra), sorrow (karuṇa), and wonder (adbhuta), each associated with a specific emotional flavor that is both individually felt and socially mediated.

== Scientific theories and models ==
A number of experiments have been conducted in the study of social and psychological affective preferences (i.e., what people like or dislike). Specific research has been done on preferences, attitudes, impression formation, and decision-making. This research contrasts findings with recognition memory (old-new judgments), allowing researchers to demonstrate reliable distinctions between the two. Affect-based judgments and cognitive processes have been examined with noted differences indicated. Some argue affect and cognition are under the control of separate and partially independent systems that can influence each other in a variety of ways. Both affect and cognition may constitute independent sources of effects within systems of information processing. Others suggest emotion is a result of an anticipated, experienced, or imagined outcome of an adaptational transaction between organism and environment, therefore cognitive appraisal processes are keys to the development and expression of an emotion.

== Perception ==
=== Feelings of certainty ===
The way that we see other people express their emotions or feelings determines how we respond. The way an individual responds to a situation is based on feeling rules. If an individual is uninformed about a situation the way they respond would be in a completely different demeanor than if they were informed about a situation. For example, if a tragic event had occurred and they had knowledge of it, their response would be sympathetic to that situation. If they had no knowledge of the situation, then their response may be indifference. A lack of knowledge or information about an event can shape the way an individual sees things and the way they respond.

Timothy D. Wilson, a psychology professor, tested this theory of the feeling of uncertainty along with his colleague Yoav Bar-Anan, a social psychologist. Wilson and Bar-Anan found that the more uncertain or unclear an individual is about a situation, the more invested they are. Since an individual does not know the background or the ending of a story they are constantly replaying an event in their mind which is causing them to have mixed feelings of happiness, sadness, excitement, and so forth. If there is any difference between feelings and emotions, the feeling of uncertainty is less sure than the emotion of ambivalence: the former is precarious, the latter is not yet acted upon or decided upon.

The neurologist Robert Burton, writes in his book On Being Certain, that feelings of certainty may stem from involuntary mental sensations, much like emotions or perceptual recognition (another example might be the tip of the tongue phenomenon).

Individuals in society want to know every detail about something in hopes of maximizing the feeling for that moment, but Wilson found that feeling uncertain can lead to something being more enjoyable because it has a sense of mystery. In fact, the feeling of not knowing can lead them to constantly think and feel about what could have been.

== Sensations ==
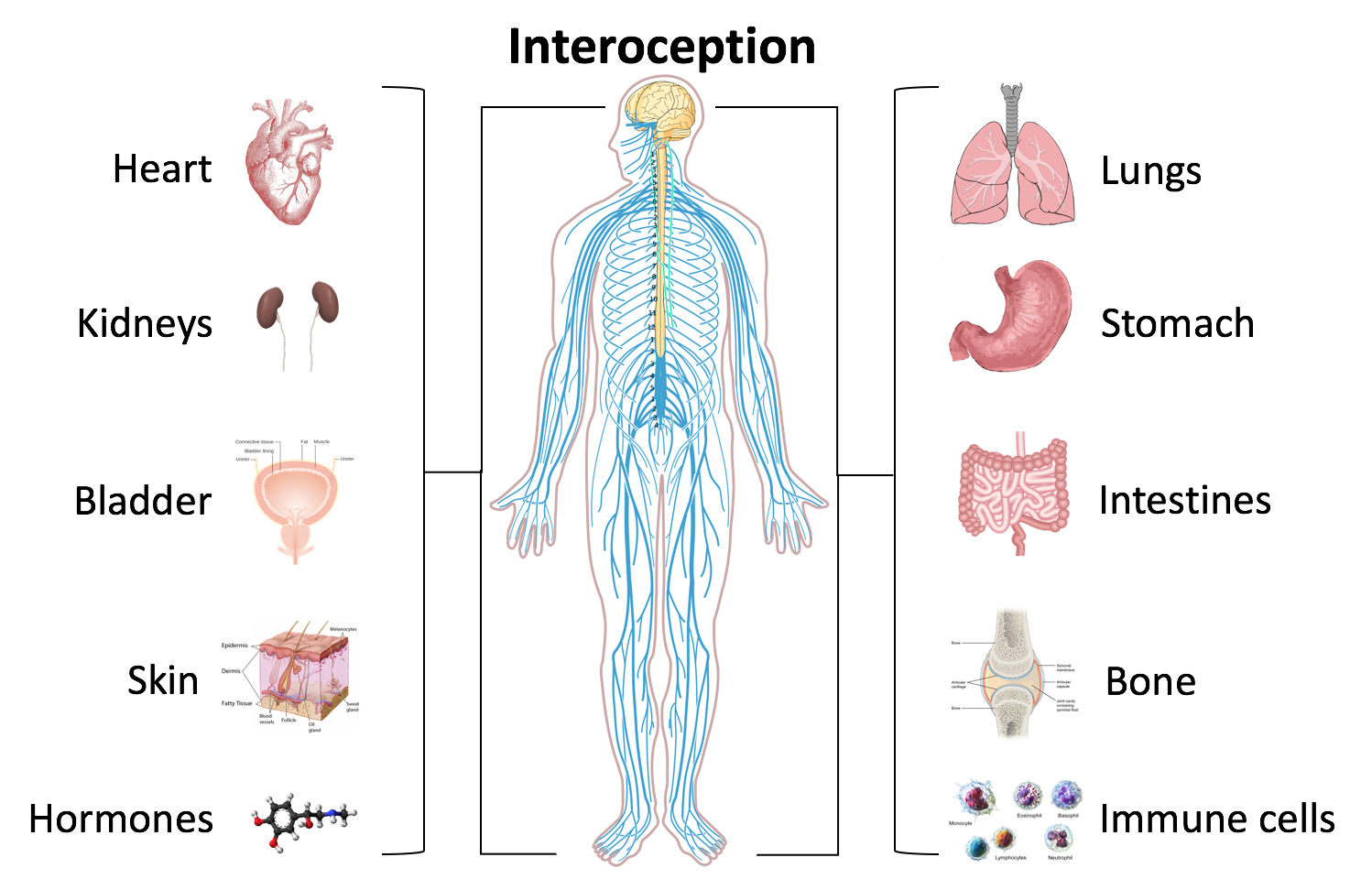

Sensation occurs when sense organs collect various stimuli (such as a sound or smell) for transduction, meaning transformation into a form that can be understood by the nervous system.

=== Interoception ===
==== Gut ====
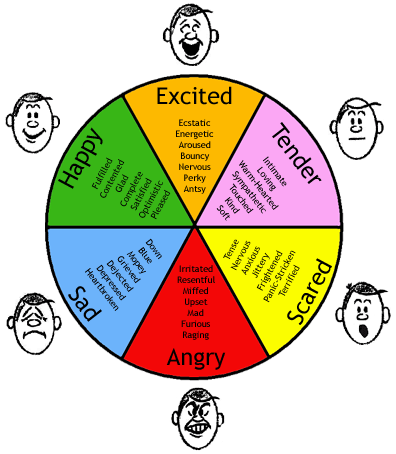
Examples of six basic emotions

A gut feeling, or gut reaction, is a visceral emotional reaction to something. It may be negative, such as a feeling of uneasiness, or positive, such as a feeling of trust. Gut feelings are generally regarded as not modulated by conscious thought, but sometimes as a feature of intuition rather than rationality. The idea that emotions are experienced in the gut has a long historical legacy, and many nineteenth-century doctors considered the origins of mental illness to derive from the intestines.

The phrase "gut feeling" may also be used as a shorthand term for an individual's "common sense" perception of what is considered "the right thing to do", such as helping an injured passerby, avoiding dark alleys and generally acting in accordance with instinctive feelings about a given situation. It can also refer to simple common knowledge phrases which are true no matter when said, such as "Fire is hot", or to ideas that an individual intuitively regards as true (see "truthiness" for examples).

==== Heart ====
The heart has a collection of ganglia that is called the "intrinsic cardiac nervous system". The feelings of affiliation, love, attachment, anger, hurt are usually associated with the heart, especially the feeling of love.

== Needs ==
A need is something required to sustain a healthy life (e.g. air, water, food). A deficiency (need) causes a clear adverse outcome: a dysfunction or death. Abraham H. Maslow, pointed out that satisfying (i.e., gratification of) a need, is just as important as deprivation (i.e., motivation to satisfy), for it releases the focus of the satisfied need, to other emergent needs.

=== Motivation ===
Motivation is what explains why people or animals initiate, continue or terminate a certain behavior at a particular time. Motivational states are commonly understood as forces acting within the agent that create a disposition to engage in goal-directed behavior. It is often held that different mental states compete with each other and that only the strongest state determines behavior.

=== Valence ===
Valence tells organisms (e.g., humans) how well or how bad an organism is doing (in relation to the environment), for meeting the organism's needs.

== Feelings about feelings ==
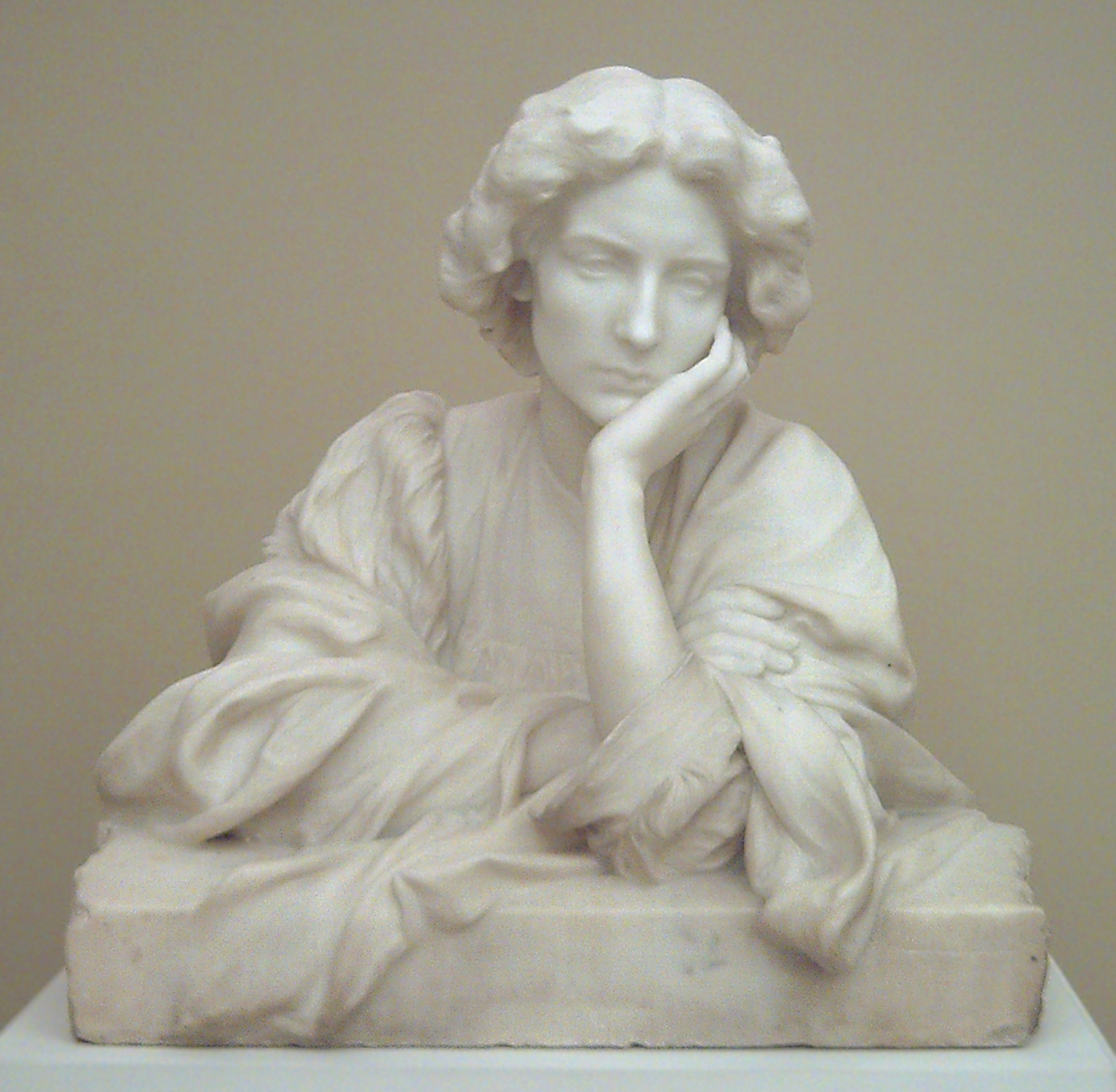
Sensitive, sculpture by M. Blay (c. 1910)

Individuals in society predict that something will give them a certain desired outcome or feeling. Indulging in what one might have thought would've made them happy or excited might only cause a temporary thrill, or it might result in the opposite of what was expected and wanted. Events and experiences are done and relived to satisfy one's feelings.

Details and information about the past are used to make decisions, as past experiences of feelings tend to influence current decision-making, how people will feel in the future, and if they want to feel that way again. Gilbert and Wilson conducted a study to show how pleased a person would feel if they purchased flowers for themselves for no specific reason (such as a birthday, anniversary, promotion, etc.) and how long they thought that feeling would last. People who had no experience of purchasing flowers for themselves and those who had experienced buying flowers for themselves were tested. Results showed that those who had purchased flowers in the past for themselves felt happier and that feeling lasted longer for them than for a person who had never experienced purchasing flowers for themselves.

Arlie Russell Hochschild, a sociologist, depicted two accounts of emotion. The organismic emotion is the outburst of emotions and feelings. In organismic emotion, emotions/feelings are instantly expressed. Social and other factors do not influence how the emotion is perceived, so these factors have no control on how or if the emotion is suppressed or expressed. In interactive emotion, emotions and feelings are controlled. The individual is constantly considering how to react or what to suppress. In interactive emotion, unlike in organismic emotion, the individual is aware of their decision on how they feel and how they show it.

Erving Goffman, a sociologist and writer, compared how actors withheld their emotions to how the everyday individual does so. Like actors, individuals can control how emotions are expressed, but they cannot control their inner emotions or feelings. Inner feelings can only be suppressed in order to achieve the expression one wants people to see on the outside. Goffman explains that emotions and emotional experience are ongoing phenomena that an individual is consciously and actively working through. Individuals want to conform to society with their inner and outer feelings.

Anger, happiness, joy, stress, and excitement are some of the feelings that can be experienced in life. In response to these emotions, our bodies react as well. For example, nervousness can lead to the sensation of having "knots in the stomach" or "butterflies in the stomach".

=== Self-harm ===
Negative feelings can lead to harm. When an individual is dealing with an overwhelming amount of stress and problems in their lives, there is the possibility that they might consider self-harm. When one is in a good state of feeling, they never want it to end; conversely, when someone is in a bad state of mind, they want that feeling to disappear. Inflicting harm or pain to oneself is sometimes the answer for many individuals because they want something to keep their mind off the real problem. These individuals cut, stab, and starve themselves in an effort to feel something other than what they currently feel, as they believe the pain to be not as bad as their actual problem. Distraction is not the only reason why many individuals choose to inflict self-harm. Some people inflict self-harm to punish themselves for feeling a certain way. Other psychological factors could be low self-esteem, perfectionism, or social anxiety.

== See also ==
- Affective science
- Alexithymia
- Cognitive neuroscience
- Hard problem of consciousness
- Mind–body problem
- Qualia
