= Cerebellar cognitive affective syndrome =

Cognitive and affective symptoms of cerebellum damage

- Other names: Schmahmann's syndrome
- Specialty: Neurology

Cerebellar cognitive affective syndrome (CCAS), also called Schmahmann's syndrome, is a condition that follows from lesions (damage) to the cerebellum of the brain. It refers to a constellation of deficits in the cognitive domains of executive function, spatial cognition, language, and affect. Impairments of executive function include problems with planning, set-shifting, abstract reasoning, verbal fluency, and working memory, and there is often perseveration, distractibility and inattention. Language problems include dysprosodia, agrammatism and mild anomia. Deficits in spatial cognition produce visual–spatial disorganization and impaired visual–spatial memory. Personality changes manifest as blunting of affect or disinhibited and inappropriate behavior. These cognitive impairments result in an overall lowering of intellectual function. CCAS challenges the traditional view of the cerebellum being responsible solely for regulation of motor functions. It is now thought that the cerebellum is responsible for monitoring both motor and nonmotor functions. The nonmotor deficits described in CCAS are believed to be caused by dysfunction in cerebellar connections to the cerebral cortex and limbic system.

== Signs and symptoms ==
CCAS has been described in both adults and children. The precise manifestations may vary on an individual basis, likely reflecting the precise location of the injury in the cerebellum. These investigators subsequently elaborated on the affective component of the CCAS, i.e., the neuropsychiatric phenomena. They reported that patients with injury isolated to the cerebellum may demonstrate distractibility, hyperactivity, impulsiveness, disinhibition, anxiety, ritualistic and stereotypical behaviors, illogical thought and lack of empathy, aggression, irritability, ruminative and obsessive behaviors, dysphoria and depression, tactile defensiveness and sensory overload, apathy, childlike behavior, and inability to comprehend social boundaries and assign ulterior motives.

CCAS can be recognized by the pattern of deficits involving executive function, visual-spatial cognition, linguistic performance and changes in emotion and personality. Underdiagnosis may reflect lack of familiarity of this syndrome in the scientific and medical community. The nature and variety of the symptoms may also prove challenging. Levels of depression, anxiety, lack of emotion, and affect deregulation can vary between patients. The symptoms of CCAS are often moderately severe following acute injury in adults and children, but tend to lessen with time. This supports the view that the cerebellum is involved with the regulation of cognitive processes.

=== Psychiatric disorders ===
There are a number of psychiatric disorders that are thought to be related to dysfunction of the cerebellum and that appear similar to symptoms of CCAS. It has been suggested that lesions in the cerebellum may be responsible for certain characteristics of psychiatric disorders, such as schizophrenia, depression, bipolar disorder, attention deficit hyperactivity disorder (ADHD), developmental dyslexia, Down syndrome, and Fragile X syndrome. Schmahmann's dysmetria of thought hypothesis has been applied to these psychiatric disorders. In schizophrenia, it has been suggested that there is dysfunction of the cortical-thalamo-cerebellar circuit, which leads to problems with emotional behaviors and cognition. Supporting this idea are postmortem studies that have shown smaller anterior portions of the vermis and reduced density of the Purkinje cells in the vermis in schizophrenia. There are several pieces of evidence that support the hypothesis that symptoms of some psychiatric disorders are the result of cerebellar dysfunction. One study found that people with schizophrenia had smaller inferior vermis and less cerebellar hemispheric asymmetry than control adults. It has also been found that individuals with ADHD have smaller posterior inferior lobes than a control group. Other studies have suggested that the size of the vermis is correlated with the severity of ADHD. A study of people with dyslexia showed lower activation via positron emission tomography (PET) in the cerebellum during a motor task relative to a control group.

== Cause ==
The causes of CCAS lead to variations in symptoms, but a common core of symptoms can be seen regardless of etiology. Causes of CCAS include cerebellar agenesis, dysplasia and hypoplasia, cerebellar stroke, tumor, cerebellitis, trauma, and neurodegenerative diseases (such as progressive supranuclear palsy and multiple system atrophy). CCAS can also be seen in children with prenatal, early postnatal, or developmental lesions. In these cases there are lesions of the cerebellum resulting in cognitive and affect deficits. The severity of CCAS varies depending on the site and extent of the lesion. In the original report that described this syndrome, patients with bihemispheric infarction, pancerebellar disease, or large unilateral posterior inferior cerebellar artery (PICA) infarcts had more cognitive deficits than patients with small right PICA infarcts, small right anterior interior cerebellar artery infarcts or superior cerebellar artery (SCA) territory. Overall, patients with damage to either the posterior lobe of the cerebellum or with bilateral lesions had the greatest severity of symptoms, whereas patients with lesions in the anterior lobe had less severe symptoms. In children, it was found that those with astrocytoma performed better than those with medulloblastoma on neuropsychological tests.

== Pathology ==
=== Cerebellar pathways ===
There are pathways that have been proposed to explain the non-motor dysfunctions seen in CCAS. A leading view of CCAS is the dysmetria of thought hypothesis, which proposes that the non-motor deficits in CCAS are caused by dysfunction in the cerebrocerebellar system linking the cerebral cortex with the cerebellum. The normal cerebellum is now thought to be responsible for regulating motor, cognitive and emotional behaviors. When there is some type of damage to the cerebellum, this regulation is affected, leading to deregulation of emotional behaviors. This effect has been compared to dysmetria of movement, which describes the motor dysfunctions seen after cerebellar lesions. These ideas build upon earlier theories and results of investigations indicating that the cerebellum is linked with the frontal orbital cortex, limbic system, and reticular structures. It was proposed that these circuits are involved with emotional regulation, such that damage to this circuit would result in behavioral dysfunctions such as hyperactivity, apathy, and stimulus-seeking behaviors.

Connections lead from the cerebral cortex (including sensorimotor regions as well as cognitively relevant association areas and emotion-related limbic areas) to the cerebellum by a two-stage feed forward system. The pathway starts in the layer V neurons of the cerebral cortex that project via the cerebral peduncle to the neurons of the anterior portion of the pons (the basis pontis). The pontine axons projects via the contralateral middle cerebellar peduncle, terminating in the cerebellar cortex as mossy fibers. The feedback circuit from the cerebellum to the cerebral cortex is also a two-stage system. The cerebellar cortex projects to the deep cerebellar nuclei (the corticonuclear microcomplex). The deep nuclei then project to the thalamus, which in turn projects back to the cerebral cortex. This cerebrocerebellar circuit is key to understanding the motor as well as the non-motor roles of the cerebellum. The relevant cognitive areas of the cerebral cortex that project to the cerebellum include the posterior parietal cortex (spatial awareness), the supramodal areas of the superior temporal gyrus (language), the posterior parahippocampal areas (spatial memory), the visual association areas in the parastriate cortices (higher-order visual processing), and the prefrontal cortex (complex reasoning, judgment attention, and working memory). There are also projections from the cingulate gyrus to the pons. The organization of these anatomical pathways helps clarify the role the cerebellum plays in motor as well as non-motor functions. The cerebellum has also been shown to connect brainstem nuclei to the limbic system with implications for the function of the neurotransmitters serotonin, norepinephrine, and dopamine and the limbic system.

=== Cerebellar anatomy ===
It has been suggested that specific parts of the cerebellum are responsible for different functions. Mapping of the cerebellum has shown that sensorimotor, motor, and somatosensory information is processed in the anterior lobe, specifically in lobules V, VI, VIII A/B. The posterior lobe (notably cerebellar lobules VI and VII) is responsible for cognitive and emotional functions. Lobule VII includes the vermis in the midline, and the hemispheric parts of lobule VIIA (Crus I and Crus II), and lobule VIIB). This explains why CCAS occurs with damage to the posterior lobe. In the study of Levisohn et al. children with CCAS showed a positive correlation between damage to the midline vermis and impairments in affect. The authors hypothesized that deficits in affect are linked to damage of the vermis and fastigial nuclei, whereas deficits in cognition are linked to damage of the vermis and cerebellar hemispheres. These notions were consistent with the earlier suggestion (by psychiatrist Robert G. Heath), that the vermis of the cerebellum is responsible for emotional regulation. The deep nuclei of the cerebellum also have specific functions. The interpositus nucleus is involved with motor function, the dentate nucleus with cognitive functions, and the fastigial nucleus with limbic functions. It has been shown that phylogenetically the dentate nuclei developed with the association areas of the frontal cortex, supporting the view that the dentate nucleus is responsible for cognitive functions.

=== Lateralization ===
There have been studies that show laterality effects of cerebellar damage with relation to CCAS. Language in the cerebellum seems to be contralateral to the dominant language hemisphere in the frontal lobes, meaning if the language is dominant in the left hemisphere of the frontal lobes, the right side of the cerebellum will be responsible for language (see Tedesco et al. for a discussion of lack of lateralization). Lateralization is also observed with visuospatial functions. One study found that patients with left cerebellar lesions performed more poorly on a visuospatial task than did patients with right cerebellar lesions and healthy control adults. It has also been shown that lesions of the right cerebellum result in greater cognitive deficits than lesions of the left hemisphere.

== Treatments ==
The current treatments for CCAS focus on relieving the symptoms. One treatment is a cognitive-behavioral therapy (CBT) technique that involves making the patient aware of their cognitive problems. For example, many CCAS patients struggle with multitasking. With CBT, the patient would have to be aware of this problem and focus on just one task at a time. This technique is also used to relieve some motor symptoms. In a case study with a patient who had a stroke and developed CCAS, improvements in mental function and attention were achieved through reality orientation therapy and attention process training. Reality orientation therapy consists of continually exposing the patient to stimuli of past events, such as photos. Attention process training consists of visual and auditory tasks that have been shown to improve attention. The patient struggled in applying these skills to “real-life” situations. It was the help of his family at home that significantly helped him regain his ability to perform activities of daily living. The family would motivate the patient to perform basic tasks and made a regular schedule for him to follow.

Transcranial magnetic stimulation (TMS) has also been proposed to be a possible treatment of psychiatric disorders of the cerebellum. One study used TMS on the vermis of patients with schizophrenia. After stimulation, the patients showed increased happiness, alertness and energy, and decreased sadness. Neuropsychological testing post-stimulation showed improvements in working memory, attention, and visual spatial skill. Another possible method of treatment for CCAS is doing exercises that are used to relieve the motor symptoms. These physical exercises have been shown to also help with the cognitive symptoms.

Medications that help relieve deficits in traumatic brain injuries in adults have been proposed as candidates to treat CCAS. Bromocriptine, a direct D2 agonist, has been shown to help with deficits in executive function and spatial learning abilities. Methylphenidate has been shown to help with deficits in attention and inhibition. Neither of these drugs has yet been tested on a CCAS population. It may also be that some of the symptoms of CCAS improve over time without any formal treatment. In the original report of CCAS, four patients with CCAS were re-examined one to nine months after their initial neuropsychological evaluation. Three of the patients showed improvement in deficits without any kind of formal treatment, though executive function was still found to be one standard deviation below average. In one patient, the deficits worsened over time. This patient had cerebellar atrophy and worsened in visual spatial abilities, concept formation, and verbal memory.

== Future research ==
There is much research that needs to be conducted on CCAS. A necessity for future research is to conduct more longitudinal studies in order to determine the long-term effects of CCAS. One way this can be done is by studying cerebellar hemorrhage that occurs during infancy. This would allow CCAS to be studied over a long period to see how CCAS affects development. It may be of interest to researchers to conduct more research on children with CCAS, as the survival rate of children with tumors in the cerebellum is increasing.
