= Emotions and culture =

Link between emotions and culture

An emotion is a conscious, intentional response directed toward an object; is dependent on cultural, biological, and psychological factors; and is observer-dependent—emotions exist only in the minds of individuals. Emotions are both intrapersonal and interpersonal phenomena, are often conveyed behaviorally (e.g., facial expressions, body postures, inflections), and are almost always felt physiologically (e.g., increased heart rate). People around the world experience emotions, and thus how emotions are experienced, expressed, perceived, and regulated varies greatly. Enculturation, or the socialization of a developing human mind to a particular culture context, is the platform from which variation in emotion emerges.

Human neurology can explain some of the cross-cultural similarities in emotional phenomena, including certain physiological and behavioral changes. However, the way that emotions are expressed and understood varies across cultures. Though most people experience similar internal sensations, the way these are categorized and interpreted is shaped by language and social context. This relationship is not one-sided – because behavior, emotion, and culture are interrelated, emotional expression can also influence cultural change or maintenance over time.

There are three main perspectives on how emotions occur, and the relative importance of biology and culture. Discrete emotion theory takes a categorical approach, suggesting there is a universal set of distinct, basic emotions that have unique patterns of behavior, experiences, physiological changes, and neural activity. Social constructionist theories suggest emotions are more deeply culturally influenced, shaping our perception and experience of the world according to the language, norms, and values within a given social context. The final perspective takes an integrated approach, exploring the interaction of biology and culture to explain the social influences on the categorization and subjective experience of emotion.

== Early research ==
Charles Darwin was among the first to study emotion and culture in his book The Expression of the Emotions in Man and Animals, suggesting emotions and their expression are universal and evolutionary. Darwin considered the face to be the primary medium of emotional expression in humans, capable of representing both major emotions and subtle variations within each one. Though he argued facial expressions were universal, gestures were considered culturally specific. Since then, the idea of the seven basic emotions (i.e., happiness, sadness, anger, contempt, fear, disgust, and surprise) has ignited debate about the origins of emotion.

In the early 1960s, Silvan Tomkins' Affect Theory built upon Darwin's research, arguing that facial expressions are biological and universal manifestations of emotions. In 1971, psychologists Paul Ekman and Carroll Izard explored the universality of emotions, creating sets of photographs displaying emotions that were recognizable to Americans. These photographs were recognized as expressing the same feelings by cultures in Africa, Asia, Europe, and North and South America. From this, the researchers concluded that facial expressions were universal, innate, and based in evolution.

In addition to pioneering research in psychology, ethnographic accounts of cultural differences in emotion began to emerge. Gregory Bateson, an English anthropologist, used photography and film to document his time with the people of Bajoeng Gede in Bali. He observed cultural differences in Balinese mothers' muted emotional responses to their children's intense emotions, and mother-child displays of love and anger did not follow Western social norms. The fieldwork of anthropologist Jean Briggs details her almost two-year experience living with an Utku Inuit family in her book Never in Anger: Portrait of an Eskimo Family. She described the culture as particularly unique in emotional control – expressions of anger or aggression were rarely observed, and resulted in ostracism.

The term emotive, coined by anthropologist William Reddy, attempts to distinguish societal emotional values and expressions from individual's emotional experience. In The Making of Romantic Love, Reddy argues that romantic love is a 12th-century European construct, built in response to the parochial view that sexual desire was immoral, and was not present in cultures outside of Europe at the time. Reddy suggests that the distinction between sexual passion and love was not present in Heain Japan or the Indian kingdoms of Bengal and Odisha. These cultures did not view sexual desire as a form of appetite, unlike the view popularized by the Christian Church. Sexuality was not spiritually distinct from love: indeed, sex was often used as a medium of spiritual worship, emulating the divine love between Krishna and Radha. Sexual desire and love were inextricable from one another.

== Cultural norms of emotions ==
Culture guides our understanding, expectations, and interpretations of human emotion and behavior. Cultural expectations of emotion are sometimes referred to as display rules, internalized through a socialization process. The social consequences and valuation of different emotions also vary across cultures. Ekman and Friesen suggest that display rules vary across cultures, genders, or backgrounds, shaping emotional expression accordingly. A cultural syndrome, as defined by Triandis, is a "shared set of beliefs, attitudes, norms, values, and behavior organized around a central theme and found among speakers of one language, in one time period, and in one geographic region". Because culture is a shared experience, there are social implications for emotional expression and experiences that vary between situations and individuals. Hochschild discusses the role of feeling rules, which are social norms that prescribe how people should feel in different situations. These rules can be general (how people should express emotions overall) and also situational (how people should express emotions during specific events).

Cultural scripts are cultural norms that influence our expectations for emotional regulation and experience. They shape the perceived value and desirability of different emotions, influencing ideal affect (what people want to feel). The dominant cultural script in Western cultures is to maximize positive emotions and minimize negative emotions. In Eastern cultures, the dominant cultural script is based in dialectical thinking and seeks to find a balance between positive and negative emotions. Cultural influences on ideal affect can be detected very early. Children are socialized to learn ideal affect through cultural products such as storybooks, showing cross-cultural differences by preschool age. European American preschoolers preferred excited smiles and activities over calm ones, and perceived an excited smile as happier than Taiwanese Chinese preschoolers did. This is reflected in best-selling American books containing more exciting content than their Taiwanese counterparts.

Happiness is generally valued across cultures, but it is viewed in subtly different ways. In individualistic cultures, happiness is viewed as infinite, personally attainable, and experienced internally. In collectivistic cultures, happiness is relational, based on social and external factors, and experienced alongside other people. Uchida, Townsend, Markus, and Bergseiker suggest that Japanese contexts reflect a conjoint model of agency, meaning that emotions are formed within a relational context. In American contexts, emotions are experienced individually and through self-reflection, reflecting a disjoint model. When Americans are asked about emotions, they are more likely to have self-focused responses, whereas a typical Japanese reaction would reflect emotions between the self and others.

== Culture and emotion regulation ==
Emotions play a critical role in interpersonal relationships and how people relate to each other. Emotional exchanges can have serious social consequences that can result in either maintaining and enhancing positive relationships or becoming a source of antagonism and discord (Fredrickson, 1998; Gottman & Levenson, 1992). Even though people may generally "want to feel better than worse" (Larsen, 2000), how these emotions are regulated may differ across cultures. Research by Yuri Miyamoto suggests that cultural differences influence emotion regulation strategies. Research also indicates that different cultures socialize their children to regulate their emotions according to their own cultural norms. For example, ethnographic accounts suggest that American mothers think that it is important to focus on their children's successes while Chinese mothers think it is more important to provide discipline for their children. To further support this theory, a laboratory experiment found that when children succeeded on a test, American mothers were more likely than Chinese mothers to provide positive feedback (e.g. "You're so smart!"), in comparison to Chinese mothers who provided more neutral or task relevant feedback (e.g. "Did you understand the questions or did you just guess?"; Ng, Pomerantz, & Lam, 2007). This shows how American mothers are more likely to "up-regulate" positive emotions by focusing on their children's success whereas Chinese mothers are more likely to "down-regulate" children's positive emotions by not focusing on their success.

Americans see emotions as internal personal reactions; emotions are about the self (Markus & Kityama, 1991). In America, emotional expression is encouraged by parents and peers while suppression is often disapproved. Keeping emotions inside is viewed as being insincere as well as posing a risk to one's health and well-being. In Japanese culture, however, emotions reflect relationships in addition to internal states. Some research even suggests that emotions that reflect the inner self cannot be separated from emotions that reflect the larger group. Therefore, unlike American culture, expression of emotions is often discouraged, and suppressing one's individual emotions to better fit in with the emotions of the group is looked at as mature and appropriate.

=== Emotional perception and recognition ===
While traditionally emotional perception and recognition was thought of as identical processes across groups that relies on interpretation of standard sets of facial expressions, more recent research suggests the cultural context of upbringing can affect emotional perception and recognition of people in significant ways. Cultural context serves as important frameworks for the perceiver to allocate attention when attempting to attribute emotions.

A cultural effect on the perception of facial expression is observed across different groups, emotions such as startled and sneers in a Western Caucasian context are expressed generally across the face are instead interpreted as surprise and anger by Asian participants due to a stronger focus on eyes when assessing emotional expression. Identical sets of facial expressions have also been seen to reflect distinct emotions in different cultural groups. Furthermore, certain cultural groups seem to disregard facial expressions in emotional perception in favor of inferences based on actions. A difference in the neuronal correlate of emotional perception is also seen, distinct brain activities have been observed in participants of different cultural groups when asked to perceive the emotions of ingroup and outgroup members and certain facial expressions associated with emotions.

On the level of social context, while surveyed and accounted for by individuals across cultures, a more pronounced emphasis its utilization in emotional perception is observed in individuals that belong to a collectivist cultural group.

== Individualistic vs. collectivistic cultures ==
Contemporary literature has traced the influence of culture on a variety of aspects of emotion, from emotional values to emotion regulation. Indeed, culture may be best understood as a channel through which emotions are molded and subsequently expressed. Indeed, this had been most extensively discussed in psychology by examining individualistic and collectivistic cultures.

The individualistic vs. collectivistic cultural paradigm has been widely used in the study of emotion psychology. Collectivistic cultures are said to promote the interdependence of individuals and the notion of social harmony. Indeed, Niedenthal suggests that "the needs, wishes, and desires of the collectives in which individuals find themselves are emphasized, and the notion of individuality is minimized or even absent from the cultural model". Individualistic cultures, however, promote individual autonomy and independence. Individual needs, wishes, and desires are emphasized, and the possibility of personal attainment is encouraged. Collectivistic cultures include those of Asia and Latin America, whilst individualistic cultures include those of North America and Western Europe. North America, specifically, is seen to be the prototype of an individualistic culture.

Research has shown that the collectivism vs. individualism paradigm informs cultural emotional expression. An influential paper by Markus & Kitayama, on the influence of culture on emotion, established that in more collectivistic cultures, emotions were conceived as relational to the group. Thus, in collectivistic cultures, emotions are believed to occur between people, rather than within an individual. When Japanese school students were asked about their emotions, they usually stated than an emotion comes from their outside social surroundings. When asked about where the emotions they feel originate from, Japanese school students never referred to themselves first. This suggests that Japanese people believe emotions exist within the environment, between individuals, in line with collectivistic values. Individualistic cultures, however, conceive emotions as independent internal experiences, occurring within an individual. When American school students were asked about their emotions, they usually stated that they experienced emotions within themselves. This suggests that Americans consider emotions as personal, experienced internally and independently. Markus & Kitayama purport that emotions like friendliness and shame - which promote interconnectedness - are predominant in Asian culture. Conversely, European-American cultures were shown to be predominated by individualistic emotions, such as pride or anger.

=== Emotion values and culture ===
Various cultures also have values for and against diverse emotional states. Collectivistic cultures have been observed to express positive emotions in a more calming way. While, Individualistic cultures have been observed to commonly express positive emotions in a highly aroused way. A psychologist discovered that East Africans are encourage to focus on the body response of emotions. Russians, however, are encouraged to view negative emotions as functions with benefits into one's functioning in life. They are encouraged to embrace and even actively seek out negative emotional experiences, recognizing their potential for personal growth and meaningful function.

A study have looked into the storybooks as tools of socialization for children on emotions. The results of the study revealed that Taiwanese cultures display a preference for a more calming state of happiness, whilst American culture display a preference for an exciting state of happiness. Utilisation of storybooks that were most popular in their respective cultures revealed that storybooks in Taiwanese cultures included content with calm happiness inducing content, while in American cultures storybooks included content with exciting happiness inducing content. Thus, this shows collectivistic cultures like Taiwanese cultures prefer a calm state of emotion and American cultures prefer an exciting state of emotion

Another study has shown that American culture values high arousal positive states such as excitement, over low arousal positive states such as calmness. However, in Chinese culture low arousal positive states are preferable to high arousal positive states. The researchers provide a framework to explain this, suggesting that high arousal positive states are needed in order to influence someone else, where low arousal positive states are useful for adjusting to someone else. This explanation is in line with the collectivism-individualism dichotomy: American values promote individual autonomy and personal achievement, where Asian values promote relational harmony. Emotion expression is consequently seen to be influenced largely by the culture in which a person has been socialized.

Interestingly, a study has been done on conformity of emotion among individuals of individualistic culture and collectivistic culture. Individuals from an individualistic culture tend to follow the emotional norms of their society more so than individuals in collectivistic culture. The study revealed that individuals from individualistic culture have reported more similar emotional experience and preferences within individuals of their culture. This was explained to be due to the emphasis of authenticity in the individualistic culture. Since emotions are strongly viewed to be representation of their authentic self, there lies more pressure to follow the norms of the society when it comes to emotional expression. Emotion expression are hence affected by values placed on individuals through society norms.

=== Emotion suppression ===
Collectivistic cultures are believed to be less likely to express emotions, in fear of upsetting social harmony. Miyahara, referencing a study conducted on Japanese interpersonal communication, purports that the Japanese "are low in self-disclosure, both verbally and non-verbally.... Most of these attributes are ascribed to the Japanese people's collectivistic orientations". The study conducted showed that Japanese individuals have a relatively low expression of emotion. Niedenthal further suggests that: "Emotional moderation in general might be expected to be observed in collectivist cultures more than in individualistic cultures, since strong emotions and emotional expression could disrupt intra-group relations and smooth social functioning".

Individualistic cultures are seen to express emotions more freely than collectivistic cultures. In a study comparing relationships among American and Japanese individuals, it was found that: "People in individualistic cultures are motivated to achieve closer relationships with a selected few and are willing to clearly express negative emotions towards others". Research by Butler et al., found that the social impact of emotion suppression is moderated by the specific culture. Whilst the suppression of emotion by those with European Americans values led to non-responsive reactions and hostility, individuals with bicultural Asian-American values were perceived as less hostile and more engaged when they suppressed their emotions. Thus, individuals with Asian-American values were more skilled in emotional suppression than individuals with European-American values. The article explanation is that Asian-Americans may engage in habitual suppression more often as negative emotions are seen to cause social disharmony and thus contradict cultural values.

=== Culture and emotion socialization ===
Research undertaken in the socialization of children cross-culturally has shown how early cultural influences start to affect emotions. Studies have shown the importance of socializing children in order to imbue them with emotional competence. Research by Friedlmeier et al., suggests children must be socialized in order to meet the emotional values and standards of their culture. For instance, in dealing with negative emotions, American parents were more likely to encourage emotion expression in children, thus promoting autonomy and individualistic competence. East Asian parents, however, attempted to minimize the experience of the negative emotion, by either distracting their child or trying to make their child suppress the emotion. This promotes relational competence and upholds the value of group harmony. Children are thus socialized to regulate emotions in line with cultural values.

Further research has assessed the use of storybooks as a tool with which children can be socialized to the emotional values of their culture. Taiwanese values promote ideal affect as a calm happiness, where American ideal affect is excited happiness. Indeed, it was found that American preschoolers preferred excited smiles and perceived them as happier than Taiwanese children did, and these values were seen to be mirrored in storybook pictures. Importantly, it was shown that across cultures, exposure to story books altered children's preferences. Thus, a child exposed to an exciting (versus calm) book, would alter their preference for excited (versus calm) activity. This shows that children are largely malleable in their emotions, and suggests that it takes a period of time for cultural values to become ingrained.

Another study has shown that American culture values high arousal positive states such as excitement, over low arousal positive states such as calmness. However, in Chinese culture low arousal positive states are preferable to high arousal positive states. The researchers provide a framework to explain this, suggesting that high arousal positive states are needed in order to influence someone else, where low arousal positive states are useful for adjusting to someone else. This explanation is in line with the collectivism-individualism dichotomy: American values promote individual autonomy and personal achievement, where Asian values promote relational harmony. Emotion expression is consequently seen to be influenced largely by the culture in which a person has been socialized.

However, a recent study on emotions by Adarsh Badri suggests that emotions can be an important anchor for understanding the ecological activism in the global South. By incorporating how emotional practices in global South have sought to reconcile human-nature relations, Badri shows that affective-relations play a critical role in dealing with the Anthropocene condition of today.

=== Culture of honor ===
Nisbett & Cohen's 1996 study Culture of Honor examines the violent honor culture in the Southern states of the US. The study attempts to address why the southern USA is more violent, with a higher homicide rate, than its northern counterpart. It is suggested that the higher rate of violence is due to the presence of a 'culture of honor' in the southern USA. A series of experiments were designed to determine whether southerners got angrier than northerners when they were insulted. In one example, a participant was bumped into and insulted, and their subsequent facial expressions were coded. Southerners showed significantly more anger expressions. Furthermore, researchers measured cortisol levels, which increase with stress and arousal, and testosterone levels, which increase when primed for aggression. In insulted southerners, cortisol and testosterone levels rose by 79% and 12% respectively, which was far more than in insulted northerners. With their research, Nisbett & Cohen show that southern anger is expressed in a culturally specific manner.

Since the late 2000's the difference between southern states homicide rates and the rest of the United States has mostly disappeared (with the exceptions of Louisiana and Mississippi). Texas and Florida have relatively low homicide rates, while DC, Illinois, Missouri, and New Mexico have higher ones. It is unknown if this means the "culture of honor" no longer exists, if it never existed, or if the measured emotional differences are caused by social and economic differences rather than culture.

== Challenges in cultural research of emotions ==
A significant challenge in cross-cultural research of human emotion is encountered in sampling. The expression of emotions varies within a culture based on variables like gender, sex and marital status. It is important to consider this variation when comparing populations from different cultures, and to ensure they are relatively homogeneous across variables other than the cultural construct of interest (eg. individualism vs. collectivism). While doing this is relatively straightforward with some variables, such as age, it can be challenging to do with others, like social class and education. Additionally, there is a lack of sampling diversity. The majority of cross-cultural research on emotion has been conducted by Westerners, and Western samples often consist of WEIRD (Western, educated, industrialized, rich and democratic) populations. If comparable samples are drawn cross-culturally, this may limit the diversity of those samples, leaving doubts about the generalizability of the findings to the broader population within those cultures. Not only is there a lack of sampling diversity within cultures, but there is also a lack of diversity between comparisons of the cultures themselves. Currently, the literature is dominated by comparisons between Western (usually American) and Eastern Asian (usually Japanese or Chinese) sample groups. Another challenge outlined by Matsumoto (1990) is that culture is ever changing and dynamic. Culture is not static. As the cultures continue to evolve it is necessary that research capture these changes. Identifying a culture as "collectivistic" or "individualistic" can provide a stable as well as inaccurate picture of what is really taking place. No one culture is purely collectivistic or individualistic and labeling a culture with these terms does not help account for the cultural differences that exist in emotions. As Matsumoto argues, a more contemporary view of cultural relations reveals that culture is more complex than previously thought.

Translation is also a key issue in studies involving cultures that speak different languages. Materials may need to be modified when translating from one language to another, since literal translations may end up sounding awkward. Additionally, finding words to describe emotions that have comparable definitions in other languages can be very challenging. For example, happiness, which is considered one of the six basic emotions, in English has a very positive and exuberant connotation. In Hindi, Sukhi is a similar term, however it refers to more of a content state that is associated with peacefulness. Although both refer to a general positive state, the unique connotations may lead to different interpretations of the terms, which are meant to refer to the same construct. When using translated materials in a new cultural context, it must also be considered if the situations are transferrable to the new context. For instance, a situation that may have evoked anger in individuals from Western cultures may evoke feelings of shame in individuals from Eastern cultures, and researchers may inadvertently end up comparing different emotions.

=== Further research ===
Studies have shown that Western and Eastern cultures have distinct differences in emotional expressions with respect to hemi-facial asymmetry; Eastern population showed bias to the right hemi-facial for positive emotions, while the Western group showed left hemi-facial bias to both negative and positive emotions.

Recently, the valence and arousal of the twelve most popular emotion keywords expressed on the micro-blogging site Twitter were measured using latent semantic clustering in three geographical regions: Europe, Asia and North America. It was demonstrated that the valence and arousal levels of the same emotion keywords differ significantly with respect to these geographical regions — Europeans are, or at least present themselves as more positive and aroused, North Americans are more negative and Asians appear to be more positive but less aroused when compared to global valence and arousal levels of the same emotion keywords. This shows that emotional differences between Western and Eastern cultures can, to some extent, be inferred through their language style.

=== Conclusion ===
Culture affects every aspect of emotions. Identifying which emotions are good or bad, when emotions are appropriate to be expressed, and even how they should be displayed are all influenced by culture. Even more importantly, cultures differently affect emotions, meaning that exploring cultural contexts is key to understanding emotions. Through incorporating sociological, anthropological, and psychological research accounts it can be concluded that exploring emotions in different cultures is very complex and the current literature is equally as complex, reflecting multiple views and the hypothesis.

== See also ==
- Affect display
- Aversion to happiness
- Cross-cultural
- Emotion classification
- Group emotion
- History of emotions
- Individualism
