= Emotion perception =

Ability of recognizing emotions in others

Emotion perception refers to the capacities and abilities of recognizing and identifying emotions in others, in addition to biological and physiological processes involved. Emotions are typically viewed as having three components: subjective experience, physical changes, and cognitive appraisal; emotion perception is the ability to make accurate decisions about another's subjective experience by interpreting their physical changes through sensory systems responsible for converting these observed changes into mental representations. The ability to perceive emotion is believed to be both innate and subject to environmental influence and is also a critical component in social interactions. How emotion is experienced and interpreted depends on how it is perceived. Likewise, how emotion is perceived is dependent on past experiences and interpretations. Emotion can be accurately perceived in humans. Emotions can be perceived visually, audibly, through smell and also through bodily sensations and this process is believed to be different from the perception of non-emotional material.

== Modes of perception ==
Emotions can be perceived through visual, auditory, olfactory, taste and physiological sensory processes. Nonverbal actions can provide social partners with information about subjective and emotional states. This nonverbal information is believed to hold special importance and sensory systems and certain brain regions are suspected to specialize in decoding emotional information for rapid and efficient processing.

=== Visual ===
The visual system is the primary mode of perception for the way people receive emotional information. People use emotional cues displayed by social partners to make decisions regarding their affective state. Emotional cues can be in the form of facial expressions, which are actually a combination of many distinct muscle groups within the face, or bodily postures (alone or in relation to others), or found through the interpretation of a situation or environment known to have particular emotional properties (i.e., a funeral, a wedding, a war zone, a scary alley, etc.). While the visual system is the means by which emotional information is gathered, it is the cognitive interpretation and evaluation of this information that assigns it emotional value, garners the appropriate cognitive resources, and then initiates a physiological response. This process is by no means exclusive to visual perception and in fact may overlap considerably with other modes of perception, suggesting an emotional sensory system comprising multiple perceptual processes all of which are processed through similar channels.

==== Facial perception ====
A great deal of research conducted on emotion perception revolves around how people perceive emotion in others' facial expressions. Whether the emotion contained in someone's face is classified categorically or along dimensions of valence and arousal, the face provides reliable cues to one's subjective emotional state. As efficient as humans are in identifying and recognizing emotion in another's face, accuracy goes down considerably for most emotions, with the exception of happiness, when facial features are inverted (i.e., mouth placed above eyes and nose), suggesting that a primary means of facial perception includes the identification of spatial features that resemble a prototypical face, such that two eyes are placed above a nose which is above a mouth; any other formation of features does not immediately constitute a face and requires extra spatial manipulation to identify such features as resembling a face.

===== Discrete versus dimensional views =====
Research on the classification of perceived emotions has centered around the debate between two fundamentally distinct viewpoints. One side of the debate posits that emotions are separate and discrete entities whereas the other side suggests that emotions can be classified as values on the dimensions of valence (positive versus negative) and arousal (calm/soothing versus exciting/agitating). Psychologist Paul Ekman supported the discrete emotion perspective with his groundbreaking work comparing emotion perception and expression between literate and preliterate cultures. Ekman concluded that the ability to produce and perceive emotions is universal and innate and that emotions manifest categorically as basic emotions (anger, disgust, fear, happiness, sadness, contempt, surprise, and possibly contempt). The alternative dimensional view garnered support from psychologist James Russell, who is best known for his contributions toward the circumplex of emotion. Russell described emotions as constructs which lie on the dimensions of valence and arousal and it is the combination of these values which delineate emotion. Psychologist Robert Plutchik sought to reconcile these views and proposed that certain emotions be considered "primary emotions" which are grouped either positively or negatively and can then be combined to form more complex emotions, sometimes considered "secondary emotions", such as remorse, guilt, submission, and anticipation. Plutchik created the "wheel of emotions" to outline his theory.

===== Culture =====
Culture plays a significant role in emotion perception, most notably in facial perception. Although the features of the face convey important information, the upper (eyes/brow) and lower (mouth/nose) regions of the face have distinct qualities that can provide both consistent and conflicting information. As values, etiquette, and quality of social interactions vary across cultures, facial perception is believed to be moderated accordingly. In western cultures, where overt emotion is ubiquitous, emotional information is primarily obtained from viewing the features of the mouth, which is the most expressive part of the face. However, in eastern cultures, where overt emotional expression is less common and therefore the mouth plays a lesser role in emotional expression, emotional information is more often obtained from viewing the upper region of the face, primarily the eyes. These cultural differences suggest a strong environmental and learned component in emotion expression and emotion perception.

===== Context =====
Although facial expressions convey key emotional information, context also plays an important role in both providing additional emotional information and modulating what emotion is actually perceived in a facial expression. Contexts come in three categories: stimulus-based context, in which a face is physically presented with other sensory input that has informational value; perceiver-based context, in which processes within the brain or body of a perceiver can shape emotion perception; and cultural contexts that affect either the encoding or the understanding of facial actions.

=== Auditory ===
The auditory system can provide important emotional information about the environment. Voices, screams, murmurs, and music can convey emotional information. Emotional interpretations of sounds tend to be quite consistent. Traditionally, emotion perception in the voice has been determined through research studies analyzing, via prosodic parameters such as pitch and duration, the way in which a speaker expresses an emotion, known as encoding. Alternatively, a listener who attempts to identify a particular emotion as intended by a speaker can decode emotion. More sophisticated methods include manipulating or synthesizing important prosodic parameters in speech signal (e.g., pitch, duration, loudness, voice quality) in both natural and simulated affective speech. Pitch and duration tend to contribute more to emotional recognition than loudness. Music has long been known to have emotional qualities and is a popular strategy in emotion regulation. When asked to rate emotions present in classical music, music professionals could identify all six basic emotions with happiness and sadness the most represented, and in decreasing order of importance, anger, fear, surprise, and disgust. The emotions of happiness, sadness, fear, and peacefulness can be perceived in a short length of exposure, as little as 9–16 seconds including instrumental-only music selections.

=== Olfactory ===
Aromas and scents also influence mood, for example through aromatherapy, and humans can extract emotional information from scents just as they can from facial expressions and emotional music. Odors may be able to exert their effects through learning and conscious perception, such that responses typically associated with particular odors are learned through association with their matched emotional experiences. In-depth research has documented that emotion elicited by odors, both pleasant and unpleasant, affects the same physiological correlates of emotion seen with other sensory mechanisms.

=== Somatic ===
Theories on emotion have focused on perception, subjective experience, and appraisal. Predominant theories of emotion and emotion perception include what type of emotion is perceived, how emotion is perceived somatically, and at what stage of an event emotion is perceived and translated into subjective, physical experience.

==== James–Lange theory ====
Following the influence of René Descartes and his ideas regarding the split between body and mind, in 1884 William James proposed the theory that it is not that the human body acts in response to a person's emotional state, as common sense might suggest, but rather, people interpret their emotions on the basis of their already present bodily state. In the words of James, "we feel sad because we cry, angry because we strike, afraid because we tremble, and neither we cry, strike, nor tremble because we are sorry, angry, or fearful, as the case may be." James believed it was particular and distinct physical patterns that map onto specific experienced emotions. Contemporaneously, psychologist Carl Lange arrived at the same conclusion about the experience of emotions. Thus, the idea that felt emotion is the result of perceiving specific patterns of bodily responses is called the James–Lange theory of emotion. In support of the James–Lange theory of emotion, Silvan Tomkins proposed the facial feedback hypothesis in 1963; he suggested that facial expressions actually trigger the experience of emotions and not the other way around. This theory was tested in 1974 by James Laird in an experiment where Laird asked participants to hold a pencil either between their teeth (artificially producing a smile) or between their upper lip and their nose (artificially producing a frown) and then rate cartoons. Laird found that these cartoons were rated as being funnier by those participants holding a pencil in between their teeth. In addition, Paul Ekman recorded extensive physiological data while participants posed his basic emotional facial expressions and found that heart rate raised for sadness, fear, and anger yet did not change at al for happiness, surprise, or disgust, and skin temperature raised when participants posed anger but not other emotions. While contemporary psychologists still agree with the James–Lange theory of emotion, human subjective emotion is complex and physical reactions or antecedents do not fully explain the subjective emotional experience.

==== Cannon–Bard theory of emotion ====
Walter Bradford Cannon and his doctoral student Philip Bard agreed that physiological responses played a crucial role in emotions, but did not believe that physiological responses alone could explain subjective emotional experiences. They argued that physiological responses were too slow relative to the relatively rapid and intense subjective awareness of emotion and that often these emotions are similar and imperceptible to people at such a short timescale. Cannon proposed that the mind and body operate independently in the experience of emotions such that differing brain regions (cortex versus subcortex) process information from an emotion-producing stimulus independently and simultaneously resulting in both an emotional and a physical response. This is best illustrated by imagining an encounter with a grizzly bear; you would simultaneously experience fear, begin to sweat, experience an elevated heart rate, and attempt to run. All of these things would happen at the same time.

==== Two-factor theory ====
Stanley Schachter and his doctoral student Jerome Singer formulated their theory of emotion based on evidence that without an actual emotion-producing stimulus, people are unable to attribute specific emotions to their bodily states. They believed that there must be a cognitive component to emotion perception beyond that of just physical changes and subjective feelings. Schachter and Singer suggested that when someone encounters such an emotion-producing stimulus, they would immediately recognize their bodily symptoms (sweating and elevated heart rate in the case of the grizzly bear) as the emotion fear. Their theory was devised as a result of a study in which participants were injected with either a stimulant (adrenaline) that causes elevated heart rate, sweaty palms and shaking, or a placebo. Participants were then either told what the effects of the drug were or were told nothing, and were then placed in a room with a person they did not know who, according to the research plan, would either play with a hula hoop and make paper airplanes (euphoric condition) or ask the participant intimate, personal questions (angry condition). They found that participants who knew what the effects of the drug were attributed their physical state to the effects of the drug; however, those who had no knowledge of the drug they received attributed their physical state to the situation with the other person in the room. These results led to the conclusion that physiological reactions contributed to emotional experience by facilitating a focused cognitive appraisal of a given physiologically arousing event and that this appraisal was what defined the subjective emotional experience. Emotions were thus a result of a two-stage process: first, physiological arousal in a response to an evoking stimulus, and second, cognitive elaboration of the context in which the stimulus occurred.

== Neural bases ==
Emotion perception is primarily a cognitive process driven by particular brain systems believed to specialize in identifying emotional information and subsequently allocating appropriate cognitive resources to prepare the body to respond. The relationship between various regions is still unclear, but a few key regions have been implicated in particular aspects of emotion perception and processing including areas suspected of being involved in the processing of faces and emotional information.

=== Fusiform face area ===
The fusiform face area, part of the fusiform gyrus is an area some believe to specialize in the identification and processing of human faces, although others suspect it is responsible for distinguishing between well known objects such as cars and animals. Neuroimaging studies have found activation in this area in response to participants viewing images of prototypical faces, but not scrambled or inverted faces, suggesting that this region is specialized for processing human faces but not other material. This area has been an area of increasing debate and while some psychologists may approach the fusiform face area in a simplistic manner, in that it specializes in the processing of human faces, more likely this area is implicated in the visual processing of many objects, particularly those familiar and prevalent in the environment. Impairments in the ability to recognize subtle differences in faces would greatly inhibit emotion perception and processing and have significant implications involving social interactions and appropriate biological responses to emotional information.

=== HPA axis ===
The hypothalamic-pituitary-adrenal (HPA) axis plays a role in emotion perception through its mediation of the physiological stress response. This occurs through the release of hypothalamic corticotropin-releasing factor, also known as corticotropin-releasing hormone (CRH), from nerve terminals in the median eminence arising in the paraventricular nucleus, which stimulates adrenocorticotropin release from the anterior pituitary that in turn induces the release of cortisol from the adrenal cortex. This progressive process culminating in the release of glucocorticoids to environmental stimuli is believed to be initiated by the amygdala, which evaluates the emotional significance of observed phenomena. Released glucocorticoids provide negative feedback on the system and also the hippocampus, which in turn regulates the shutting off of this biological stress response. It is through this response that information is encoded as emotional and bodily response is initiated, making the HPA axis an important component in emotion perception.

=== Amygdala ===
The amygdala appears to have a specific role in attention to emotional stimuli. The amygdala is a small, almond-shaped region within the anterior part of the temporal lobe. Several studies of non-human primates and of patients with amygdala lesions, in addition to studies employing functional neuroimaging techniques, have demonstrated the importance of the amygdala in face and eye-gaze identification. Other studies have emphasized the importance of the amygdala for the identification of emotional expressions displayed by others, in particular threat-related emotions such as fear, but also sadness and happiness. In addition, the amygdala is involved in the response to non-facial displays of emotion, including unpleasant auditory, olfactory and gustatory stimuli, and in memory for emotional information. The amygdala receives information from both the thalamus and the cortex; information from the thalamus is rough in detail and the amygdala receives this very quickly, while information from the cortex is much more detailed but is received more slowly. In addition, the amygdala's role in attention modulation toward emotion-specific stimuli may occur via projections from the central nucleus of the amygdala to cholinergic neurons, which lower cortical neuronal activation thresholds and potentiate cortical information processing.

== Disordered emotion perception ==
There is great individual difference in emotion perception and certain groups of people display abnormal processes. Some disorders are in part classified by maladaptive and abnormal emotion perception while others, such as mood disorders, exhibit mood-congruent emotional processing. Whether abnormal processing leads to the exacerbation of certain disorders or is the result of these disorders is yet unclear, however, difficulties or deficits in emotion perception are common among various disorders.

Research investigating face and emotion perception in autistic individuals is inconclusive. Past research has found atypical, piecemeal face-processing strategies among autistic individuals and a better memory for lower versus upper regions of the face and increased abilities to identify partly obscured faces. Autistic individuals tend to display deficits in social motivation and experience that may decrease overall experience with faces and this in turn may lead to abnormal cortical specialization for faces and decreased processing efficiency. However, these results have not been adequately replicated and meta-analyses have found little to no differential face processing between typically-developing and autistic individuals although autistic people reliably display worse face memory and eye perception which could mediate face and possibly emotion perception. Individuals with schizophrenia also have difficulties with all types of facial emotion expression perception, incorporating contextual information in making affective decisions, and indeed, facial perception more generally. Neuropathological and structural neuroimaging studies of these patients have demonstrated abnormal neuronal cell integrity and volume reductions in the amygdala, insula, thalamus and hippocampus and studies employing functional neuro-imaging techniques have demonstrated a failure to activate limbic regions in response to emotive stimuli, all of which may contribute to impaired psychosocial functioning.

In patients with major depressive disorder, studies have demonstrated either generalized or specific impairments in the identification of emotional facial expressions, or a bias towards the identification of expressions as sad. Neuro-pathological and structural neuroimaging studies in patients with major depressive disorder have indicated abnormalities within the subgenual anterior cingulate gyrus and volume reductions within the hippocampus, ventral striatal regions and amygdala.

Similarly, anxiety has been commonly associated with individuals being able to perceive threat when in fact none is present, and orient more quickly to threatening cues than other cues. Anxiety has been associated with an enhanced orienting toward threat, a late-stage attention maintenance toward threat, or possibly vigilance-avoidance, or early-stage enhanced orienting and later-stage avoidance. As a form of anxiety, post-traumatic stress disorder (PTSD) has also been linked with abnormal attention toward threatening information, in particular, threatening stimuli which relates to the personally relevant trauma, making such a bias in that context appropriate, but out of context, maladaptive. Such processing of emotion can alter an individual's ability to accurately assess others' emotions as well. Mothers with violence-related PTSD have been noted to show decreased medial prefrontal cortical activation in response to seeing their own and unfamiliar toddlers in helpless or distressed states of mind that is also associated with maternal PTSD symptom severity, self-reported parenting stress, and difficulty in identifying emotions and which, in turn, impacts sensitive caregiving. Moreover, child maltreatment and child abuse have been associated with emotion processing biases as well, most notably toward the experience-specific emotion of anger. Research has found that abused children exhibit attention biases toward angry faces such that they tend to interpret even ambiguous faces as angry versus other emotions and have a difficulty disengaging from such expressions while other research has found abused children to demonstrate an attentional avoidance of angry faces. It is believed to be adaptive to attend to angry emotion as this may be a precursor to danger and harm and quick identification of even mild anger cues can facilitate the ability for a child to escape the situation, however, such biases are considered maladaptive when anger is over-identified in inappropriate contexts and this may result in the development of psychopathology.

== Research methods ==
Researchers employ several methods designed to examine biases toward emotional stimuli to determine the salience of particular emotional stimuli, population differences in emotion perception, and also attentional biases toward or away from emotional stimuli. Tasks commonly utilized include the modified Stroop task, the dot probe task, visual search tasks, and spatial cuing tasks. The Stroop task, or modified Stroop task, displays different types of words (e.g., threatening and neutral) in varying colors. The participant is then asked to identify the color of the word while ignoring the actual semantic content. Increased response time to indicate the color of threat words relative to neutral words suggests an attentional bias toward such threat. The Stroop task, however, has some interpretational difficulties in addition to the lack of allowance for the measurement of spatial attention allocation. To address some of the limitations of the Stroop task, the dot probe task displays two words or pictures on a computer screen (either one at the top or left and the other on the bottom or right, respectively) and after a brief stimuli presentation, often less than 1000ms, a probe appears in the location of one of the two stimuli and participants are asked to press a button indicating the location of the probe. Different response times between target (e.g., threat) and neutral stimuli infer attentional biases to the target information with shorter response times for when the probe is in the place of the target stimuli indicating an attention bias for that type of information. In another task that examines spatial attentional allocation, the visual search task asks participants to detect a target stimulus embedded in a matrix of distractors (e.g., an angry face among several neutral or other emotional faces or vice versa). Faster detection times to find emotional stimuli among neutral stimuli or slower detection times to find neutral stimuli among emotional distractors infer an attentional bias for such stimuli. The spatial cuing task asks participants to focus on a point located between two rectangles at which point a cue is presented, either in the form of one of the rectangles lighting up or some emotional stimuli appearing within one of the rectangles and this cue either directs attention toward or away from the actual location of the target stimuli. Participants then press a button indicating the location of the target stimuli with faster response times indicating an attention bias toward such stimuli. In the morph task participants gradually scroll a facial photograph from the neutral expression to an emotion or from one emotion to another and should indicate at what frame each emotion appears on the face. A recently introduced method consists of presenting dynamic faces (videoclips) and measuring verbal reaction time (into a microphone); it is more precise than previous solutions: verbal responses to six basic emotions differ in hit rates and reaction times.

== See also ==
- Affect measures
- Affective computing
- Affective forecasting
- Affective neuroscience
- Affective science
- Affective science § Measuring emotions
- Emotion recognition
- Emotion and memory
- Emotion classification
- Emotion in animals
- Emotional expression
- Emotions and culture
- Emotions in virtual communication
- Facial expressions
- Feeling
- Sex and emotion
- Social emotion
- Sociology of emotions
