= Writer's block =

Condition in which an author experiences creative slowdown

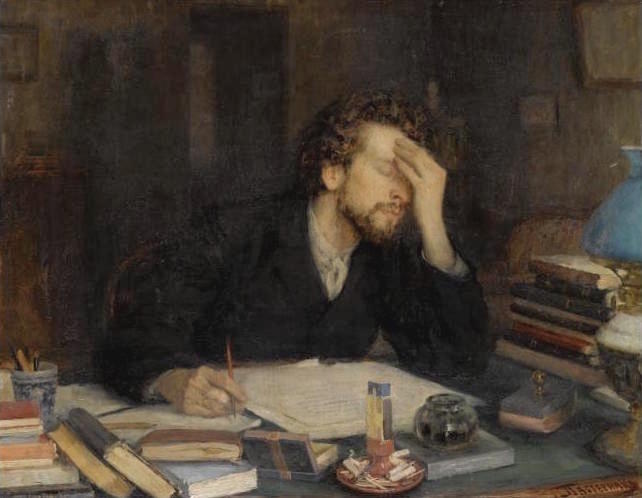
A representation of writer's block by Leonid Pasternak (1862–1945)

Writer's block is a non-medical condition, primarily associated with writing, in which an author is either unable to produce new work or experiences a creative slowdown.

Writer's block varies in severity, from difficulty in coming up with original ideas to being unable to produce work for years. This condition is not solely measured by time passing without writing; it is measured by time passing without productivity in the task at hand. Writer's block has been an acknowledged problem throughout recorded history, and many experience it. Whether novice or experienced, writers can face this struggle. While experience may be helpful in the writing process, writer's block does not exclude writing professionals.

However, the Austrian psychiatrist Edmund Bergler did not coin the term until 1947. All types of writers, including full-time professionals, academics, workers on creative projects, and those trying to finish written assignments, can experience writer's block. The condition has many causes, some that are even unrelated to writing. Most researchers of the condition agree that it primarily happens due to an affective/physiological, motivational, and cognitive component.

Studies have identified effective coping strategies for writer's block. These strategies aim to reduce anxiety about writing and range from free writing and brainstorming to professional help.

== History ==
"My novel is going very badly for the moment. That fact added to the deaths of which I have heard; of Cormenin (a friend of twenty-five years' standing), of Gavarni, and then all the rest, but that will pass. You don't know what it is to stay a whole day with your head in your hands trying to squeeze your unfortunate brain so as to find a word. Ideas come very easily to you, incessantly, like a stream. With me it is a tiny thread of water. Hard labor at art is necessary for me before obtaining a waterfall. Ah! I certainly know the agonies of style."

— Gustave Flaubert to George Sand (c. 1868).

The affliction now known as writer's block has been recognized throughout history. Writers who are known to have struggled with it include authors F. Scott Fitzgerald and Joseph Mitchell, Joseph Conrad, composer Sergei Rachmaninoff, and songwriter Adele. Another possible example is Herman Melville, who stopped writing novels a few years after writing Moby-Dick.

In earlier history, during the development of Chinese poetry, writing was not about personal expression, but rather writing was tied to rituals, communication with spirits, and representing political leaders. If an individual struggled with writing, it was not a mere block, but they were failing a societal position.

Early Romantic writers tended to attribute writer's block (whether seriously or merely poetically) to a power that no longer wanted them to write. Its interpretation became less mystical during the time of the French Symbolism. During this age, renowned poets would give up writing early in their careers on the grounds that they were unable to find the language to convey their messages. Such was the case for Arthur Rimbaud, who, after producing the bulk of his literary output during his late teenage years, completely stopped writing at the age of twenty. Though still, during the Great American Novel period (mid-19th to mid-20th century), the affliction was construed as something that stopped writers and caused them emotional instability.

The condition was first clinically described in 1947 by Austrian psychoanalyst Edmund Bergler, who identified it as being caused by oral masochism, mothers that bottle fed, and an unstable private love life. The growing reputation of psychiatry in the United States made the term gain more recognition. Research concerning this topic was done in the late 1970s and 1980s. During this time, researchers were influenced by the Process and Post-Process movements and therefore focused specifically on the writer's processes.

In 1980, American writing researcher Mike Rose published a study examining the cognitive causes of writer's block, arguing that rigid composing rules and inflexible planning strategies could interfere with the writing process.

== Causes ==
Writer's block may have several causes. Some are creative problems that originate within an author's work itself. A writer may run out of inspiration or be distracted by other events. The writer Elizabeth Gilbert, reflecting on her post-bestseller prospects, proposed that such pressure might be released by interpreting creative writers as "having" genius rather than "being" a genius.

A fictional example can be found in George Orwell's novel Keep the Aspidistra Flying, in which the protagonist Gordon Comstock struggles in vain to complete an epic poem describing a day in London: "It was too big for him, that was the truth. It had never really progressed, it had simply fallen apart into a series of fragments."

While some may think that writers block applies to only writing assignments and can only affect people in writing classes, the problem extends out of that consensus. Writer's block is more of a classification than a "writing specific" problem. To expand on this thought, the problem of writer's block is when someone feels confined and overwhelmed on a topic. This sense of overstimulation blocks our creativity receptors in the brain, causing the sense of feeling blocked. This being said, "writer's block" does not just have an effect on pen to paper, it can delay the thinking process for any kind of work or assignment resulting in a poor outcome.

=== Physiological and neurological basis ===
Physiological and neurological bases of writer's block have been suggested. Under stress, a human brain will "shift control from the cerebral cortex to the limbic system". The limbic system is associated with the instinctual processes, such as "fight or flight" response; and behavior that is based on "deeply engrained training". The limited input from the cerebral cortex hinders a person's creative processes, which is replaced by the behaviors associated with the limbic system. The person is often unaware of the change, which may lead them to believe they are creatively "blocked".

In her 2004 book The Midnight Disease: The Drive to Write, Writer's Block, and the Creative Brain, the writer and neurologist Alice W. Flaherty has argued that literary creativity is a function of specific areas of the brain, and that block may be the result of brain activity being disrupted in those areas. Flaherty suggested in her writing that there are many diseases that may impact one's ability to write. One of which she refers to is hypergraphia, or the intensive desire to write. She points out that in this condition, the patient's temporal lobe is afflicted, usually by damage, and it may be the same changes in this area of the brain that can contribute to writer's-blocking behaviors. Not to be confused with writer's block, agraphia is a neurological disorder caused by trauma or stroke causing difficulty in communicating through writing. Agraphia cannot be treated directly, but it is possible to relearn certain writing abilities.

=== Brain trauma ===
Other research identifies neurological malfunctions as a cause. Malcolm T. Cunningham showed how these malfunctions can be linked to trauma both mental and physical.

Physical damage can produce writer's block. If a person experiences tissue damage in the brain, i.e. a stroke, it is likely to lead to other complications apart from the lesion itself. This damage causes an extreme form of writer's block known as agraphia. With agraphia, the inability to write is due to issues with the cerebral cortex; this disables the brain's process of translating thoughts into writing. Brain injuries are an example of a physical illness that can cause a writer to be blocked. Other brain-related disorders and neurological disorders such as epilepsy have been known to cause the problem of writer's block and hypergraphia, the strong urge to write.

=== Writer anxiety and inhibition ===
Another cause of writer's block has been due to writer's anxiety. Writer's anxiety is defined as being worried about one's words or thoughts, thus experiencing writer's block. The fear of failure is the most commonly attributed cause of writing blocks. Failure is rooted in anxiety due to the standards placed upon scholars.Academic writing can create confusion and stress because students may feel that making mistakes will negatively affect their grades, confidence, or future success. Anxiety can interfere with creativity making it difficult for students to organize their thoughts and communication in their writing.

From a composition perspective, Lawrence Oliver said in his article "Helping Students Overcome Writer's Block": "Students receive little or no advice on how to generate ideas or explore their thoughts, and they usually must proceed through the writing process without guidance or corrective feedback from the teacher, who withholds comments and criticism until grading the final product." He said that students "learn to write by writing", and often they are insecure or paralyzed by rules.

Phyllis Koestenbaum wrote in her article "The Secret Climate the Year I Stopped Writing" about her trepidation toward writing, claiming it was tied directly to her instructor's response. She said, "I needed to write to feel, but without feeling I couldn't write." In contrast to Koestenbaum's experience, Nancy Sommers stated that papers do not end when students finish writing and that neither should instructors' comments. She urges a "partnership" between writers and instructors so that responses become a conversation.

Nihat Bayat states that writing anxiety can be conveyed emotionally due to knowing that it will be evaluated. Writing anxiety can be manifested emotionally as sadness, anger, and fear. Bayat also writes, "The negative type of writing anxiety leads to procrastination, fear, tension, loss of self-confidence and power and interruption of thinking process". As a result less motivated to participate in writing activities.

=== Student motivation ===
The notion of writer's block has been primarily conceived and explored as a breakdown in the cognitive writing process.

Herman A. Estrin in his article "Motivation in Composition Writing" writes: "When freshmen are assigned such topics for a research paper as ... they have no real background of the subject for an in-depth paper ... they prepare a mechanical, lifeless paper with no creativity, imagination, or originality". According to him, freshman students write well about topics they are passionate about. Marshall Moore, in his article "Articulate Walls: Writer's Block and the Academic Creative," thinks similarly by writing: "...his or her practice is paralysingly out of sync with the syllabus; and teaching from a state of creative depletion may engender a cascade of self-doubt. This paper will look at the process by which these practitioners attempt to navigate this zone of creative disconnect.". Saying having assigned, planned out, and required papers is contributing to loss of motivation.

Aline Alves-Wold, in her article "Assessing Writing Motivation: a Systematic Review of K-5 Students' Self-Reports" states that there is a general lack of research on the motivation of students to write in the first few years of education, which is problematic when one considers how important initial experiences are in motivating students to write. Success generally enhances one's belief in their efficacy, whereas failure weakens them. "These mechanisms are particularly evident in early phases of skill development where failure typically occurs before a sense of efficacy has been firmly established. This implies that children in their first years in school have writer self-beliefs that are particularly malleable and dynamic". Writing development is therefore both enhanced and endangered during the first years in school. A research study done on K-12 students on writer's block also observed that it is common to understand writing struggles in students as a lack of knowledge or incapability when underlying factors such as minority based backgrounds and societal struggles play a role as well.

Motivation is an important part of writing instruction because students need to be motivated to achieve and it is an important outcome of writing instruction as part of continued learning. Motivation can influece students learning goals by encouraging them to better their performance and their confidence in their writing. Motivated students can engage more in the learning process and will be more willing to develop their writing skills. They are willing to take on challenging writing tasks and endure the difficulties rather than giving up when they encounter problems. Motivated students can engage more actively in the learning process because they are able to see the value in improving writing abilities. This demonstrates that motivation is an essential factor in helping students become more successful and confident writers. Writer's block has been largely overlooked. Marshall Moore writes that having a routine or regiment can help get work done. It is essential for the academic to question their own work habits to overcome obstacles.

Research on writing suggests that writer's block is more complex than just being lazy or lacking inspiration. According to Mike Rose, strict writing guidelines and inflexible preparation techniques that restrict student's ability to write freely are frequently linked to writer's block. The writing process may be disrupted if students become excessively preoccupied with grammar, structure, or perfection.

Writer's block and writing anxiety are closely related. "Writing apprehension" is defined by John Daly and Michael Miller as anxiety or tension related to writing assignments. Students may become less confident and motivated as a result of this fear, which makes it harder for them to begin homework or keep writing.

=== Student Motivation and Self-Efficacy ===
Researcher's have discovered that writer's block is significantly influenced by motivation. According to Albert Bandura's theory of self-efficacy, students who have self-doubt are less likely to be inspired to write. Procrastination and avoidance tendencies can be amplified by low self-confidence. The impact of motivation on writing performance is also explained by Barry Zimmerman's research on self-regulated learning. Students are frequently better equipped to overcome writer's block when they actively manage their time, goals, and learning practices. According to research on writing motivation, children who are more confident in their writing skills typically do better academically.

=== Strategies to Overcome Writer's Block ===
Writing experts have suggested a number of methods to assist students in overcoming writer's block. Freewriting, a method where students write continually without thinking about grammar or correctness, is encouraged by Peter Elbow. During the drafting process, this method helps students come up with ideas and lesson their anxiety.

=== Negative self-beliefs and feeling of incompetence ===
Mike Rose stated that writer's block can be caused by a writer's history in writing, rules, and restrictions from the past. Writers can be hesitant about what they write based on how it will be perceived by the audience. Guangming Ling states that there is a negative correlation between self-efficacy and avoidance goals in studies on writing apprehension and writer's block, which suggests that having hesitations about writing may lead to less effort and thus less success.

Similarly to Ling, Dana Driscoll and Jennifer Wells explain writing dispositions in their essay "Beyond Knowledge and Skills". Driscoll and Wells argue that dispositions toward writing play crucial roles in determining whether writers are able to transfer their knowledge of writing into other contexts of life. Related to self-efficacy, Driscoll and Wells suggest that writers who have a positive self-belief are more likely to produce work than some with a negative self-belief. Self-efficacy is especially important for a writer when it comes to an unfamiliar learning or writing setting because it may seem overwhelming.

James Adams noted in his book Conceptual Blockbusting that various reasons blocks occur include fear of taking a risk, "chaos" in the pre-writing stage, judging versus generating ideas, an inability to incubate ideas, or a lack of motivation.

In "Motivation in the Writing Centre: A Peer Tutor's Experience", Leonie Kirchoff states that "The concept of 'amotivation' describes a lack of motivation due to an individual's feeling of incompetence and helplessness." Demotivation is the process of reducing or diminishing motivational basis for behavior or ongoing actions through external influences. An external factor such as feedback may affect demotivation, whereas an internal factor, such as pessimistic expectations, may cause amotivation. Even so, both concepts have similar effects on writers.

For tutors to provide students with the most appropriate feedback, scholars like Jared Featherstone from James Madison University suggest that tutors should be well educated in mindfulness strategies to combat a student's fixed mindset. He argues that tutors or instructors should be mindful enough to be grounded and focused solely on their student so they can pick up on the feelings, stress, or fixed mindsets their student might have. An unmindful tutor might accidentally reinforce a student's negative thinking patterns.

Motivation is an important part of writing instruction because students need to be motivated to achieve, and it is an important outcome of writing instruction as part of continued learning. Motivation can influence students learning goals by encouraging them to be better their performance and their confidence in their writing. Motivated students can engage more in the learning process and will be more willing to develop their writing skills.

== Coping strategies ==
Irene Clark describes the following strategies for coping with writer's block: class and group discussion, journaling, free writing and brainstorming, clustering, list making, and engaging with the text. To overcome writing blocks, Oliver suggests asking writers questions to uncover their writing process. He then recommends solutions such as systematic questioning, free writing, and encouragement. A recent study of 2,500 writers aimed to find techniques that writers themselves use to overcome writer's block. The research discovered a range of solutions from altering the time of day to write and setting deadlines to lowering expectations and using mindfulness meditation.

Mindfulness meditation has proved to increase awareness and improve writing skills. Kate Chaterdon, an English professor at Marist College, suggests that mindfulness not only improves writing skills but also allows writers to transfer their knowledge of writing into other contexts of life. Chaterdon recommends meditation as a grounding exercise to help people become more metacognitively aware. Chaterdon had conducted a study in her two writing classes at Marist College and concluded that practicing mindfulness at least once a week is essential in developing higher levels of metacognition.

Purdue University’s Online Writing Lab gives a suggestion that completing a draft before you start editing your individual sentences whenever you begin to have concerns about what you plan to write and not letting that interrupt your progress. Writers who commonly stop to verify their work as they go, it suggests marking information we may be uncertain about to check later on so the drafting can continue with minimal stopping.

Several strategies may help writers overcome difficulties associated with writer's block. Freewriting allows individuals to put their thoughts on paper without immediately worrying about grammar, organization, or perfection. Separating drafting from editing can also reduce the pressure to produce perfect writing immediately. Other approaches include setting realistic goals, establishing regular writing schedules, taking breaks when necessary, and using positive reinforcement to maintain motivation

=== Right-brain involvement ===
Garbriele Lusser Rico's concern with the mind links to brain lateralisation, also explored by Rose and Linda Flowers and John R. Hayes, among others. Rico's book Writing the Natural Way looks into invention strategies, such as clustering, which has been noted to be an invention strategy used to help writers overcome their blocks, and further emphasizes the solutions presented in works by Rose, Oliver, and Clark. Similar to Rico, James Adams discusses "right-brain" involvement in writing. While Bill Downey proposes that he is basing his approach in practical concerns, his concentration on "right-brain" techniques speaks to cognitive theory approach similar to Rico's and a more practical advice for writers to approach their writer's block. Mike Rose mentions that peer tutors provide supportive feedback so that blocked writers can feel secure in sharing their problems and experimenting with new ideas about writing.

=== Splitting the writing into smaller pieces ===
Research has also shown that it is highly effective if one breaks their work into pieces rather than doing all of their writing in one sitting, in order to produce good quality work. One method to break writing down is to use the Pomodoro technique. How it's done is by writing for 25 minutes, then taking a 5-minute break. The cycle then repeats. A study done by Elva Yohana showed that utilizing this technique can reduce cognitive overload and can be even more efficient when the time keeping tool is digitalized. While it can be helpful to split up the writing process into pieces, Patricia Huston suggests that starting with different sections of a paper, rather than trying to start with an introduction, can be a useful strategy to cope with writer's block. She points out that if a person is stuck on the introduction, they can try moving on to a different section, like a body paragraph. Huston states: "There is no need to begin at the beginning and write an article in sequence".

=== Free writing and brainstorming ===
Free writing is a widely accepted technique for overcoming writer's block. Taught by Peter Elbow, free writing is similar to brainstorming but is written in prose form without stopping. To free-write, one writes without pausing to think or edit, and one pours raw ideas onto paper. Author Benjamin Solomon described the rationale for the technique: "Writer's block is a rut, a ditch, a trap, a swampy mire, and in order to lift yourself out, you need to do something—anything!—to jog yourself into motion." Cherryl Armstrong, who worked with the South Coast Writing Project, stated that one can free-write about anything, even a completely different subject than one was going to write about: "any writing will do".

Lawrence J. Oliver claims that after free writing the writer is able to analyze many ideas that might not have been generated before and develop a clearer sense of what theme is trying to be communicated throughout the writing. Oliver suggests that freewriting is an effective method that has helped people deal with writer's block. Freewriting does not focus on grammar or style. There is only one rule for this method, and that is to keep on writing. Educators should also never read students' freewriting unless asked to do so.

=== Mind mapping ===
Mind mapping is suggested as another potential solution to writer's block. The technique involves writing a stream of consciousness on a horizontal piece of paper and connecting any similar or linked thoughts. This exercise is intended to help a writer suffering from writer's block to bypass the analytical or critical functioning of their brain and access the creative functioning more directly, stimulating the flow of ideas. Other techniques similar to clustering and mind mapping are the writing of notes on cards in a card file, and nonlinear electronic writing using hypertext.

=== Positive self-beliefs and encouragement ===
Camacho, Alves, and Boscolo wrote about enhancing students' writing motivation in the classroom. They say that to foster students' positive self-beliefs and beliefs about writing, teachers must nurture their self-beliefs, as well as their beliefs about the writing task.

=== Other techniques ===
Other ways to cope come from ideas such as The Brand Emotions Scale for Writers (BESW). Using the framework of the Differential Emotions Scale, the BESW works with grouping emotions into either states or traits and then classifying them as positive, negative passive, or negative active. Researchers can assess subjects, giving writers a chance to get more work done if left in the right emotional state, since data suggests that writers with positive emotions tend to express more than writers with negative passive or negative active. Scholars and researchers such as Mandy Bamber suggest practicing meditation to reduce negative moods like stress and anxiety. Bamber's team conducted a study on 40 university students who showed signs of anxiety. After practicing mindfulness and meditation exercises, 33 out of the 40 showed significant decreases in stress and anxiety levels.

Anne Johnstone suggests a couple of strategies to help with writer's block. When one finds oneself unable to generate content, Johnstone suggests "recopying a well-liked piece" of one's own to help generate ideas. Johnstone states that individuals who are articulate orally but struggle with writing and forming their ideas into sentences on paper should try tape-recording themselves and later transcribing it onto paper.

Feedback from professors, teachers, peers, and bosses can also help the process of overcoming writer's block. In a self-reported survey of college students whom were asked about their writing experiences as English majors, over 55% of them claimed that they used peer review as a tool for writer's block.

Students who have stronger reading habits are also less likely to experience writer's block.

More recently, it has been suggested that generative AI be utilized to overcome writer’s block. In this context, the term does not refer to ghostwriting, but rather to a form of interaction with large language models (LLMs) intended to stimulate the creative process.

== Relation to procrastination ==
Writer's block and procrastination are two similar issues that people struggle with when it comes to writing. Writer's block is an issue that can cause people to delay their goals and may prevent them from finishing writing projects. Although writer's block and procrastination are not the exact same issue, they can end up leading to one another. Writer's block is not continuing to do a task, and procrastination is delaying starting the task. In her 1987 Ph.D. thesis (published in 2012), Karen E. Peterson posited two different scenarios on how procrastination and writer's block can lead to each other. One scenario is that a person will procrastinate due to having the fear of past experiences of getting writer's block when doing a task. The other scenario is that a person will have writer's block because of the feeling of being overwhelmed about needing to do a task at the last minute after procrastinating for a long period of time.

According to some scholars like Claire Kervin, procrastination is usually a result of a negative mood and is a "short-term mood regulator". Unlike previous beliefs that procrastination is poor time management, Kervin suggests procrastination is a way individuals cope with negative emotions. Kervin's suggestion makes a connection to one of Peterson's scenarios, specifically when someone procrastinates due to fear of past experiences and begins to feel judgmental toward themselves. Kervin recommends taking a mindful approach to combating procrastination in order to become more grounded and improve self-regulation.

Procrastination can also play a role in the development of writer's block. Although procrastination is often viewed as a negative behavior, it can sometimes be a natural part of the creative process. Taking time away from writing may allow individuals to develop ideas, work through problems, and consider different approaches to their work. However, fear and hesitation can also prevent writers from expressing their thoughts and moving forward with a project

== See also ==
- Analysis paralysis
- Occupational burnout
- Process theory of composition
