= The Chepstow Gleaner =

19th-century Welsh periodical

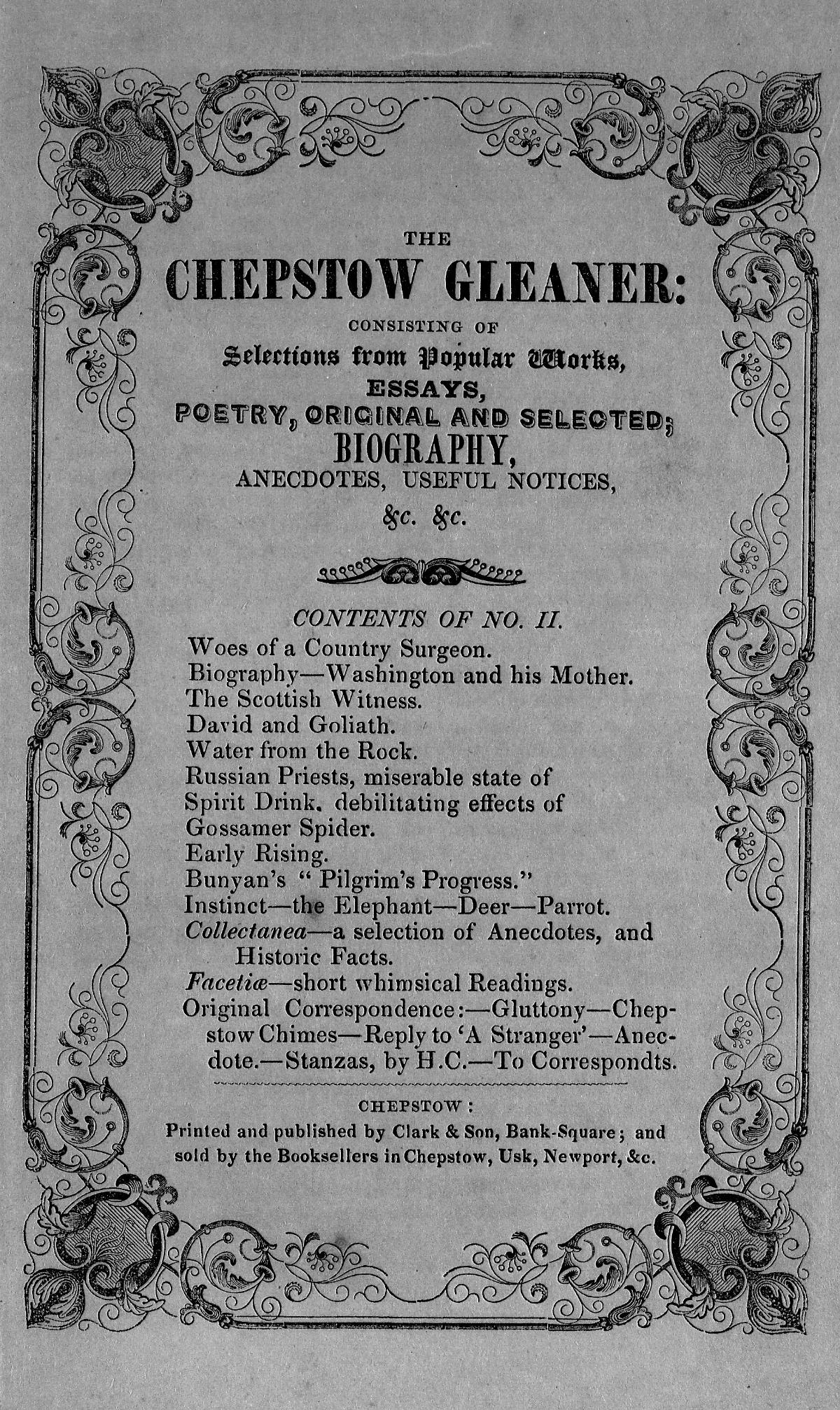
The Chepstow gleaner (Welsh Journal)

The Chepstow Gleaner was a 19th-century Welsh periodical, first produced by Clark and Son, Printers and Publishers, in Bank Square, Chepstow, Wales, in 1849 (176 years ago). It contained articles on subjects of general interest, as well as extracts from published works and poetry.
