= General interest =

General interest may refer to:

- Interest (emotion), to the general public
- Common good
- Public interest

== See also ==
- General interest channel
