= Affect display =

Verbal and non-verbal displays of emotion

Affect displays are the verbal and non-verbal displays of affect (emotion). These displays can be through facial expressions, gestures and body language, volume and tone of voice, laughing, crying, etc. Affect displays can be altered or faked so one may appear one way, when they feel another (e.g., smiling when sad). Affect can be conscious or non-conscious and can be discreet or obvious. The display of positive emotions, such as smiling, laughing, etc., is termed "positive affect", while the display of more negative emotions, such as crying and tense gestures, is called "negative affect".

Affect is important in psychology as well as in communication, mostly when it comes to interpersonal communication and non-verbal communication. In both psychology and communication, there are a multitude of theories that explain affect and its impact on humans and quality of life.

== Theoretical perspective ==
Affect can be taken to indicate an instinctual reaction to stimulation occurring before the typical cognitive processes considered necessary for the formation of a more complex emotion. Robert B. Zajonc asserts that this reaction to stimuli is primary for human beings and is the dominant reaction for lower organisms. Zajonc suggests affective reactions can occur without extensive perceptual and cognitive encoding, and can be made sooner and with greater confidence than cognitive judgments.

Lazarus on the other hand considers affect to be post-cognitive. That is, affect is elicited only after a certain amount of cognitive processing of information has been accomplished. In this view, an affective reaction, such as liking, disliking, evaluation, or the experience of pleasure or displeasure, is based on a prior cognitive process in which a variety of content discriminations are made and features are identified, examined for their value, and weighted for their contributions.

A divergence from a narrow reinforcement model for emotion allows for other perspectives on how affect influences emotional development. Thus, temperament, cognitive development, socialization patterns, and the idiosyncrasies of one's family or subculture are mutually interactive in non-linear ways. As an example, the temperament of a highly reactive, low self-soothing infant may "disproportionately" affect the process of emotion regulation in the early months of life.

== Non-conscious affect and perception ==
In relation to perception, a type of non-conscious affect may be separate from the cognitive processing of environmental stimuli. A monohierarchy of perception, affect and cognition considers the roles of arousal, attentional tendencies, affective primacy, evolutionary constraints, and covert perception within the sensing and processing of preferences and discrimination. Emotions are complex chains of events triggered by certain stimuli. There is no way to completely describe an emotion by knowing only some of its components. Verbal reports of feelings are often inaccurate because people may not know exactly what they feel, or they may feel several different emotions at the same time. There are also situations that arise in which individuals attempt to hide their feelings, and there are some who believe that public and private events seldom coincide exactly, and that words for feelings are generally more ambiguous than are words for objects or events.

Affective responses, on the other hand, are more basic and may be less problematic in terms of assessment. Brewin has proposed two experiential processes that frame non-cognitive relations between various affective experiences: those that are prewired dispositions (i.e., non-conscious processes), able to "select from the total stimulus array those stimuli that are casually relevant, using such criteria as perceptual salience, spatiotemporal cues, and predictive value in relation to data stored in memory", and those that are automatic (i.e., subconscious processes), characterized as "rapid, relatively inflexible and difficult to modify... (requiring) minimal attention to occur and... (capable of being) activated without intention or awareness" (1989 p. 381).

== Arousal ==
Arousal is a basic physiological response to the presentation of stimuli. When this occurs, a non-conscious affective process takes the form of two control mechanisms; one mobilization, and the other immobilization. Within the human brain, the amygdala regulates an instinctual reaction initiating this arousal process, either freezing the individual or accelerating mobilization.

The arousal response is illustrated in studies focused on reward systems that control food-seeking behavior. Researchers focused on learning processes and modulatory processes that are present while encoding and retrieving goal values. When an organism seeks food, the anticipation of reward based on environmental events becomes another influence on food seeking that is separate from the reward of food itself. Therefore, earning the reward and anticipating the reward are separate processes and both create an excitatory influence of reward-related cues. Both processes are dissociated at the level of the amygdala and are functionally integrated within larger neural systems.

== Affect and mood ==
Mood, like emotion, is an affective state. However, an emotion tends to have a clear focus (i.e., a self-evident cause), while mood tends to be more unfocused and diffused. Mood, according to Batson, Shaw, and Oleson (1992), involves tone and intensity and a structured set of beliefs about general expectations of a future experience of pleasure or pain, or of positive or negative affect in the future. Unlike instant reactions that produce affect or emotion, and that change with expectations of future pleasure or pain, moods, being diffused and unfocused, and thus harder to cope with, can last for days, weeks, months, or even years. Moods are hypothetical constructs depicting an individual's emotional state. Researchers typically infer the existence of moods from a variety of behavioral referents.

Positive affect and negative affect represent independent domains of emotion in the general population, and positive affect is strongly linked to social interaction. Positive and negative daily events show independent relationships to subjective well-being, and positive affect is strongly linked to social activity. Recent research suggests that "high functional support is related to higher levels of positive affect". The exact process through which social support is linked to positive affect remains unclear. The process could derive from predictable, regularized social interaction, from leisure activities where the focus is on relaxation and positive mood, or from the enjoyment of shared activities.

== Gender ==
Research has indicated many differences in affective displays due to gender. Gender, as opposed to sex, is one's self-perception of being masculine or feminine (i.e., a male can perceive himself to be more feminine or a female can perceive herself to be more masculine). It can also be argued, however, that hormones (typically determined by sex) greatly affect affective displays and mood.

== Affect and child development ==
According to studies done in the late '80s and early '90s, infants within their first year of life are not only able to begin recognizing affect displays but can begin mimicking the displays and also begin developing empathy. A study in 2011 followed up on these earlier studies by testing fifteen 6-12 month old infants' arousal, via pupil dilation, when looking at both positive and negative displays. Results showed that when presented with negative affect, an infant's pupil will dilate and stay dilated for a longer period of time when compared to neutral affect. When presented with positive affect however, the pupil dilation is much larger, but stays dilated for shorter amount of time. While this study does not prove an infant's ability to empathize with others, it does show that infants do recognize and acknowledge both positive and negative displays of emotion.

In the early 2000s over the period of about seven years, a study was done on about 200 children whose mother had "a history of juvenile-onset unipolar depressive disorder" or simply, depression as children themselves. In the cases of unipolar depression, a person generally displays more negative affect and less positive affect than a person without depression. Or, they are more likely to show when they are sad or upset, than when they are excited or happy. This study that was published in 2010 discovered that the children of mothers that have unipolar depression, had lower levels of positive affect when compared to the control group. Even as the children grew older, while the negative affect began to stay the same, the children still showed consistently lower positive affect. This study suggests that "Reduced PA [positive affect] may be one source of developmental vulnerability to familial depression..." meaning that while having family with depression, increases the risk of children developing depression, reduced positive affect increases the risk of this development. But knowing this aspect of depression, might also be able to help prevent the onset of depression in young children well into their adulthood.

== Disorders and physical disabilities ==
There are some diseases, physical disabilities and mental health disorders that can change the way a person's affect displays are conveyed. Reduced affect is when a person's emotions cannot be properly conveyed or displayed physically. There is no actual change in how intensely they truly feel emotions; there is simply a disparity between emotions felt and how intensely they are conveyed. These disorders can greatly affect a person's quality of life, depending on how intense the disability is.

=== Flat, blunted, and restricted affect ===
Flat, blunted, and restricted affects refer to a pattern in which an affected person feels an emotion but does not or cannot display it. A flat affect is the most severe case in which there is little to no display of emotions. Restricted and blunted affects are less severe. Disorders involving these reduced affect displays most commonly include schizophrenia, post traumatic stress disorder, depression, autism and traumatic brain injuries. One study has shown that people with schizophrenia that experience flat affect can also experience difficulty perceiving the emotions of a healthy individual.

=== Facial paralysis and surgery ===
People who have facial deformities or paralysis may also be physically incapable of displaying emotions. This is beginning to be corrected though, through "Facial Reanimation Surgery" which is proving not only to successfully improve a patient's affect displays, but also bettering their psychological health. There are multiple types of surgeries that can help fix facial paralysis. Some more popular types include fixing the actual nerve damage, specifically any damage to the hypoglossal nerve; facial grafts where nerves taken from a donor's leg are transplanted into the patient's face; or if the damage is more muscular versus actual nerves, muscle may be transferred into the patient's face.

== Strategic display ==
Emotions can be displayed in order to elicit desired behaviors from others.

People have been known to display positive emotions in various settings. Service workers often engage in emotional labor, a strive to maintain positive emotional expressions despite difficulties in working conditions or rude customers, in order to conform to organizational rules. Such strategic displays are not always effective, since if they are detected, lower customer satisfaction results.

Perhaps the most notable attempt to feign negative emotion could be seen with Nixon's madman theory. Nixon's administration attempted to make the leaders of other countries think Nixon was mad, and that his behavior was irrational and volatile. Fearing an unpredictable American response, leaders of hostile Communist Bloc nations would avoid provoking the United States. This diplomatic strategy was not ultimately successful.

The effectiveness of the strategic display depends on the ability of the expresser to remain undetected. It may be a risky strategy since, if detected, the person's original intent could be discovered, undermining the future relationship with the target.

According to the appraisal theory of emotions, the experience of emotions is preceded by an evaluation of an object of significance to that individual. When individuals are seen to display emotions, it serves as a signal to others of an event important to that individual. Thus, deliberately altering the emotion display toward an object could be used make the targets of the strategic emotion think and behave in ways that benefit the original expresser. For example, people attempt to hide their expressions during a poker game in order to avoid giving away information to the other players, i.e., keep a poker face.

== See also ==
- Affect (psychology)
- Affect theory
- Affective
- Affective spectrum
- Deception
- Discrete emotions theory
- Display rules
- Emotion
- Emotional contagion
- Emotional labor
- Empathy
- Facial communication
- Interpersonal deception theory
- Psychopathy
- Self-awareness
- Self-deception
- Sincerity
- Silvan Tomkins
