= Display rules =

Cultural standards for how one should express oneself

Display rules are a social group or culture's informal norms that distinguish how one should express oneself. They function as a way to maintain the social order of a given culture, creating an expected standard of behaviour to guide people in their interactions. Display rules can help to decrease situational ambiguity, help individuals to be accepted by their social groups, and can help groups to increase their group efficacy. They can be described as culturally prescribed rules that people learn early on in their lives by interactions and socializations with other people. Members of a social group learn these cultural standards at a young age which determine when one would express certain emotions, where and to what extent.

Emotions can be conveyed through both non-verbal interactions such as facial expressions, hand gestures and body language as well as verbal interactions. People are able to intensify emotions in certain situations such as smiling widely even when they receive a gift that they are not happy about or "masking" their negative emotions with a polite smile. As well, people learn to de-intensify emotions in situations such as suppressing the urge to laugh when somebody falls or neutralizing their emotions such as maintaining a serious poker face after being dealt a good hand. Display rules determine how we act and to what extent an emotion is expressed in any given situation. They are often used to protect one's own self-image or those of another person.

The understanding of display rules is a complex, multifaceted task. Display rules are understood differentially depending upon their mode of expression (verbal/facial) and the motivation for their use (prosocial/self-protective).

== Emotion ==
Emotions can be defined as brief, specific, and multidimensional responses to challenges or opportunities that are important to both personal and social goals. Emotions last up to a few seconds or minutes, and not hours or days. Emotions are very specific which suggests that there is a clear reason why a person may be feeling a certain emotion. Emotions are also used to help individuals achieve their social goals. Individuals may respond to certain challenges or opportunities during social interactions with different emotions. The selected emotions can guide a specific goal-directed behavior that can either support or hinder social relationships.

=== Concepts of emotion ===
Emotions can be broken down into different components. The first component of emotion is the appraisal stage. In this stage, individuals process an event and its impact on their personal goals. Depending on the outcome, the individual will either go through positive or negative feelings. Next, there are distinct physiological responses such as blushing, increased heart rate or sweating. The following stage of emotion is the expressive behavior; vocal or facial expressions follow an emotional state and serve to communicate their reactions or intentions (social). The fourth component is the subjective feeling, which refers to the quality that defines the experience of a specific emotion by expressing it by words or other methods. Finally, the last component is action tendencies. This suggests that emotion will motivate or guide specific behavior and bodily responses.

=== Theories of emotion ===
Emotions can be expressed verbally, with facial expressions, and with gestures. Darwin's hypothesis concerning emotion stated that the way emotions are expressed is universal, and therefore independent of culture. Ekman and Friesen conducted a study to test this theory. The study included introducing basic emotions found in the western world and introduced them to different cultures around the world (Japan, Brazil, Argentina, Chile, and the United States). Across the 5 cultures they were all able to accurately determine the emotion (success rates of 70–90%). They also introduced these selected emotions to an isolated community in Papua New Guinea that was not in contact with the western world. The results revealed that both the other cultures and isolated communities could effectively match and detect the emotional meaning of the different faces. This became evidence that emotions are expressed facially in the same way across the world.

== Culture ==
Culture is defined as "shared behaviors, beliefs, attitudes, and values communicated from generation to generation via language or some other means." Unique individuals within cultures acquire differences affecting displays of emotions emphasized by one's status, role, and diverse behaviours. Some cultures value certain emotions more over others. The affect theory argues that emotions that promote important cultural ideals will become focal in their social interactions. For example in America, they value the emotion excitement as it represents the cultural idea of independence. In many Asian cultures it is inappropriate to discuss personal enthusiasms. Greater value is placed on emotions such as calmness and contentedness, representing the ideal harmonious relationships. These different cultural values affect a person's everyday behaviours, decisions and emotional display.

People learn how to greet one another, how to interact with others, what, where, when and how to display emotions through the people they interact with and the place they grow up in. Everything can be traced back to one's culture. Gestures is an example of how one may express oneself, however these gestures represent different meanings depending on the culture. For example, in Canada, sticking out one's tongue is a sign of disgust or disapproval, however in Tibet it is a sign of respect when greeting someone. In America, holding one's middle and index fingers up makes the peace sign, while in some countries such as the UK and Australia it a sign of disrespect.

High and low-contact cultures also vary in the amount of physical interaction and direct contact there is during one-on-one communication. High-contact cultures involve people practicing direct eye contact, frequent touching, physical contact, and having close proximity to others. Examples of countries that have a high-contact culture include Mexico, Italy, and Brazil. Low-contact cultures involve people who practice less direct eye contact, little touching, have indirect body orientation, and more physical distance between people. Examples of countries that have a low-contact culture include the United States, Canada, and Japan.

Individualist and collectivistic cultures have different social norms for display rules. Personal feelings and expressionism tend to have greater importance in individualistic cultures than collectivistic ones. Although there is still variability within the two, further research is needed on intercultural variability. It is hypothesized that there would be greater ingroup differences within individualistic cultures from person to person, known as interindividual variations.

== Social influence ==
=== Family and peers ===
Ekman and Friesen (1975) have suggested that unwritten codes or "display rules" govern the manner in which emotions may be expressed, and that different rules may be internalized as a function of an individual's culture, gender or family background. For instance, many different cultures necessitate that particular emotions should be masked and that other emotions should be expressed drastically. Emotions can have significant consequences on the founding of interpersonal relationships.

Children's understanding and use of display rules is strongly associated with their social competence and surrounding. Many personal display rules are learned in the context of a particular family or experience; many expressive behaviour and rule displays are adopted by copying or adopting similar behaviours than their social and familial surrounding. Parents' affect and control influence their children's display rule through both positive and negative responses. Mcdowell and Parke (2005) suggested that parents who exert more control over their children's emotions/behaviour would deprive them of many opportunities to learn about appropriate vs. inappropriate emotional/rule displays. Hence, by depriving children from learning through control (i.e. not allowing them to learn from their own mistakes), parents are restraining children's learning of prosocial rule display.

The social environment can influence whether one controls or displays their emotions. There are few factors influencing the children's decision to either control or express an emotion that they are experiencing including the type of audience. In fact, depending on if children are in the presence of peers or of family (i.e. mother or father), they will report different control over their expression of emotions. Regardless of the type of emotion experienced, children control significantly more their expression of emotion in the presence of peers than when they are with their caregiver or alone.

=== School environment ===
The school environment is also a place where emotions and behaviours are influenced. During a child's grade school years, they can become increasingly more aware of the accepted display rules that are found in their social environment. They learn more and more about which emotions to express and which emotions not to express in certain social situations at school.

=== Emotions and social relationships ===
Emotions can serve as a way of communicating with others and can guide social interactions. Being able to express or understand other emotions can help encourage social interactions and help achieve personal goals. When expressing or understanding one's emotions is difficult, social interactions can be negatively impacted.

Emotional intelligence is a concept that is defined by four skills:

1. The ability to accurately perceive other emotions.
2. The ability to understand one's own emotions.
3. The ability to use current feelings to help in making decisions.
4. The ability to manage one's emotions to best match the current situation.

== Development ==
Age plays an important role in the development of display rules. Throughout life a person will gain experience and have more social interactions. According to a study by Jones, social interactions are the main factor in the creation and understanding of display rules. It starts at a very young age with family, and continues with peers. By meeting more people, facing more challenges, and advancing in life, a person will develop different responses which will depend mostly on the age of the person. This explains why a young person will have different social interactions than someone older.

=== Infancy ===
Infancy is a complex period when studying display rules. At a very young age, an infant does not know how to talk, therefore they express themselves in different ways. In order to communicate with others, they use facial and vocal displays that are specific for each age-period. A study conducted by Malatesta and Haviland demonstrated that a baby can have 10 different categories for facial expression:

- Interest
- Enjoyment
- Surprise
- Sadness/distress
- Anger
- Knit brow
- Discomfort/pain
- Brow flash
- Fear
- Disgust

However, fear and disgust will develop progressively during childhood. They are complex facial expressions that require knowledge and understanding and must be learned, not copied; this is why not everybody is afraid of the same things. Most of the facial expressions will be learned through the parents, mainly from the mother. The mother-infant relationship is key in the development of display rules during infancy. It is the synchrony of mother-infant expressions. To express themselves vocally babies require the use of "screaming" or "crying". There is no differentiation for the request of a baby. This is why the relationship with the parents is important: they must teach the infant when and for what reason to cry (i.e. need of food).

=== Childhood ===
During childhood, the expression of display rules becomes more complex. Children develop the ability to modulate their emotional expressions growing up, this development depends on the level of maturity and the level of social interactions with others. Children growing up start to become aware of oneself and slowly aware of others. At this time, they understand the importance of non-verbal communication, and shape the manner in which emotion may be expressed, with this change in perception, children will internalize different rules. Those rules are relative to two major factors:

- The environment: The social environment impacts the way someone reacts emotionally. The audience and the context are essential to understand display rules among children.
- The temperament: According to Leslie Brody, parents that socialise their kids the same way with equal level of nurturance, will observe different responses and reactions.

These two factors will help create "personal display rules" and the development of a sense of empathy toward others (i.e., feeling sad when a friend lost a relative even if one did not know the person).

This process will continue to change and grow until adulthood. During adolescence, a transition period where the person is not a child anymore but not an adult yet, is a test period as they learn to deal with internal conflict. Emotions are more intense and harder to control due to the hormonal changes that come at this period of time.

=== Adulthood ===
During adulthood, people are capable of using a lot of different display rules depending on the situation they are facing and the people they are with. Society governs how and when someone should express emotions, however display rules are not something static, they are in a constant evolution. Therefore, even during adulthood, a person will develop new ways to hide, express or cope with emotions. At the same time, adults will develop a greater control of their feelings and this can be seen mostly in the work environment. A study presented by the Journal of Occupational Health Psychology showed that nurses working in the same environment are more likely to share the same display rules in order to achieve an organisational objective. Display rules are not only personal, but they are shared between people and can differ according to the hierarchy of the society.

== See also ==
- Affect display
- Developmental psychology
- Emotional labor
- Emotions and culture § Cultural norms of emotions
- History of emotions
- Status quo
