= Differential Emotions Scale =

Psychological self-assessment

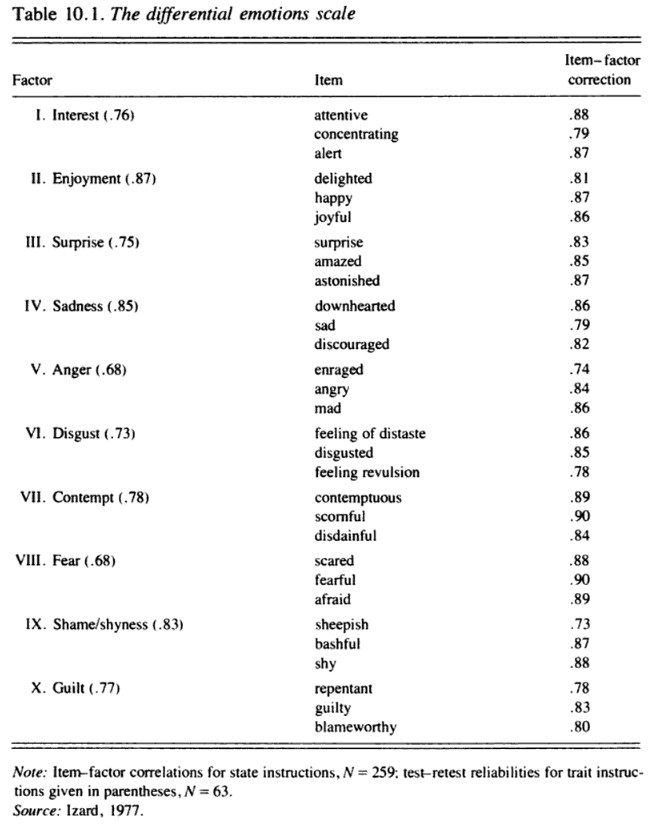
Example of the Differential Emotions Scale

The Differential Emotions Scale (DES) (Izard, 1997s) is a multidimensional self-report device for assessment of an individual's emotions (whether fundamental emotions or patterns of emotions). The DES helps measure mood based on Carroll Izard's differential emotions theory, The DES consists of thirty items, three for each of the ten fundamental emotions as visualized by Izard: interest, joy, surprise, sadness, anger, disgust, contempt, fear, shame/ shyness, and guilt, which are represented on 5-point Likert scale. There are currently four different versions of the scale. Across the different versions, the basic idea is very similar. Participants are asked to rate each of the emotions on a scale, and depending on the instructions given, they either rate their current feelings, feelings over the past week, or over long-term traits (i.e. how often do you feel this emotion in your day-to-day living). The DES is similar to other scales such as the Multiple Affect Adjective Check List (MAACL) and the Multiple Affect Adjective Check List-Revised (MAACL-R) which are used to assess either the state or trait affect by varying the time of which instructions are given to the participants.

== Theory ==
The Differential Emotions Theory evaluates the intensity of primary emotions to gain understanding between basic emotions and associated constructs of facial expression. The theory defines emotion(s) as an intricate process within neuromuscular, phenomenological, and neurophysiological areas. Within the neuromuscular aspect, it is the facial activity and patterning and body response. In the phenomenological aspect, it is the motivational experience or experience that has instant significance towards the individual. As for the neuropsychological aspect, it is primarily the patterns of the electrochemical activity within the brain.

The theory emphasises on the discrete emotions along with five assumptions (one: the fundamental emotions; two: the fundamental emotions each have distinctive motivational properties; three: these fundamental emotions lead to different experiences and behaviour; four: emotions interact and one emotion can trigger another; five: emotions influence and interact with other processes such as: homeostatic, drive, perceptual, cognitive, and motor processes).

The first significant evidence that supports the DET is based on Ekman's (1971) neurocultural theory (recognition of facial expression and emotion). Data collected from this field of research led to Izard's development of the DET. Unlike Ekman's research and theory where it focuses on the explanation of universal and cultural differences in facial expression of emotion, Izard focuses on the functions of emotions and its role as a component in motivating human behaviour.

=== Development ===
The name Differential Emotions Scale came from the examination of verbal labels and facial expressions. Research have shown that participants of different backgrounds (i.e. ethnicity, culture, language) are all able to agree on and can differentiate different facial expressions among the fundamental emotions. Research was done on American, English, French, and Greek subjects, who were asked to verbally describe a series of fundamental emotion photographs of cross-cultural and standardised facial expressions. This provided background support and allowed for further development upon the DES by helping generate a set of words for the different emotions that could be understood across cultures.

==== DES-IV ====
The DES-IV is a version of the DES where it has 49 items. This version of mood-state inventory is a multidimensional instrument, and is used to look over and examine the frequency of multiple fundamental human emotions. The 49 items of the DES-IV help measure 12 basic emotions (interest, joy, surprise, sadness, anger, disgust, contempt, hostility, fear, shame, shyness and guilt). It was also suggested by Boyle (1985) that DES-IV and the Eight State Questionnaire are one of the more promising self-report multivariate mood-state instruments.

== Reliability and validity ==
The DES takes form of self-report, where individuals are asked to rank their emotions within the discrete categories of fundamental emotions. Due to the subjective-experience component of this system, this therefore leads to the many concerns and criticism as to whether or not this will hinder the reliability and validity of the results attained. DES is different from other multivariate measures of mood states as it is based on the principle that characteristic patterns of fundamental emotions are involved in the mood states such as anxiety and depressed feelings.

Many studies have been carried out on large samples, these factor analyses have supported at least eight of the suggested fundamental emotions. However, findings from these studies also suggest that the construct validity of the DES sub-scales are not clear. Improvement in areas of sub-scales, internal consistency, and reliability of the instrument throughout retests will be needed to help improve overall reliability and validity. One of the largest setbacks of this scale is self-reporting factor. The transparency of items may lead to self-distortion and response bias (i.e. poor self-perception or faking responses).

Many studies have exploited the DES and have been able to prove that emotions factors as highly stable. From these studies and analyses, it suggests that factors acquired are constant with the theoretically defined factors. The DES has been used in studies of anxiety and depression, patterns of emotion in love and jealousy, and relationship of subjective sexual arousal and emotion.

== Analytic technique ==
=== Computational analyses ===
Computational analysis is a strategy that consists of exploratory or bind factor analyses which is then also processed through confirmatory factor analyses. Results of an exploratory analysis may be able to provide a heuristic and suggestive value, which can then be helpful in the generation of hypotheses that are able to carry out more objective testing. Confirmatory factor analyses provides a direct test of a specific model, therefore making it the primary source in determining the validity of DES. The analysis also provides an estimate for the correlation between items within the group factors and correlation between group factors.

== Criticism ==
Although Izard's theory and differential scale have been used in multiple studies, it has also been criticised to that it is too narrow and focuses too much on negative emotions rather than keeping a balance. Although the DES allows researchers to assess emotions in a continuous aspect, due to the exclusion and lack of consideration of low-energy states (i.e. fatigue and serenity), it can affect results gathered through different emotion studies. In fact, these low-energy states are said to have great relation to mood, and are also feelings that are commonly felt in our day-to-day life. Which therefore means that they have great relevance and should be considered in the process of studying about moods, feelings, and emotions.

Another criticism upon Izard's Differential Emotions Scale was that it may be impossible to capture the little differences within everyday experiences without including many different states instead of using non-specific terms (i.e. upset, distressed) which are ambiguous and do not correspond to one single emotion. This applies to positive emotions as well as interest, joy, happiness and excitement are usually the terms used.

Despite being able to show high intercorrelations, the scale of this instrument is only able to show low internal consistency. Due to the minimal number of items, it can also cause reliability problems upon results attained.

== See also ==
- Caroll E. Izard
- Discrete Emotions Theory
