= Robert Plutchik =

American psychologist (1927–2006)

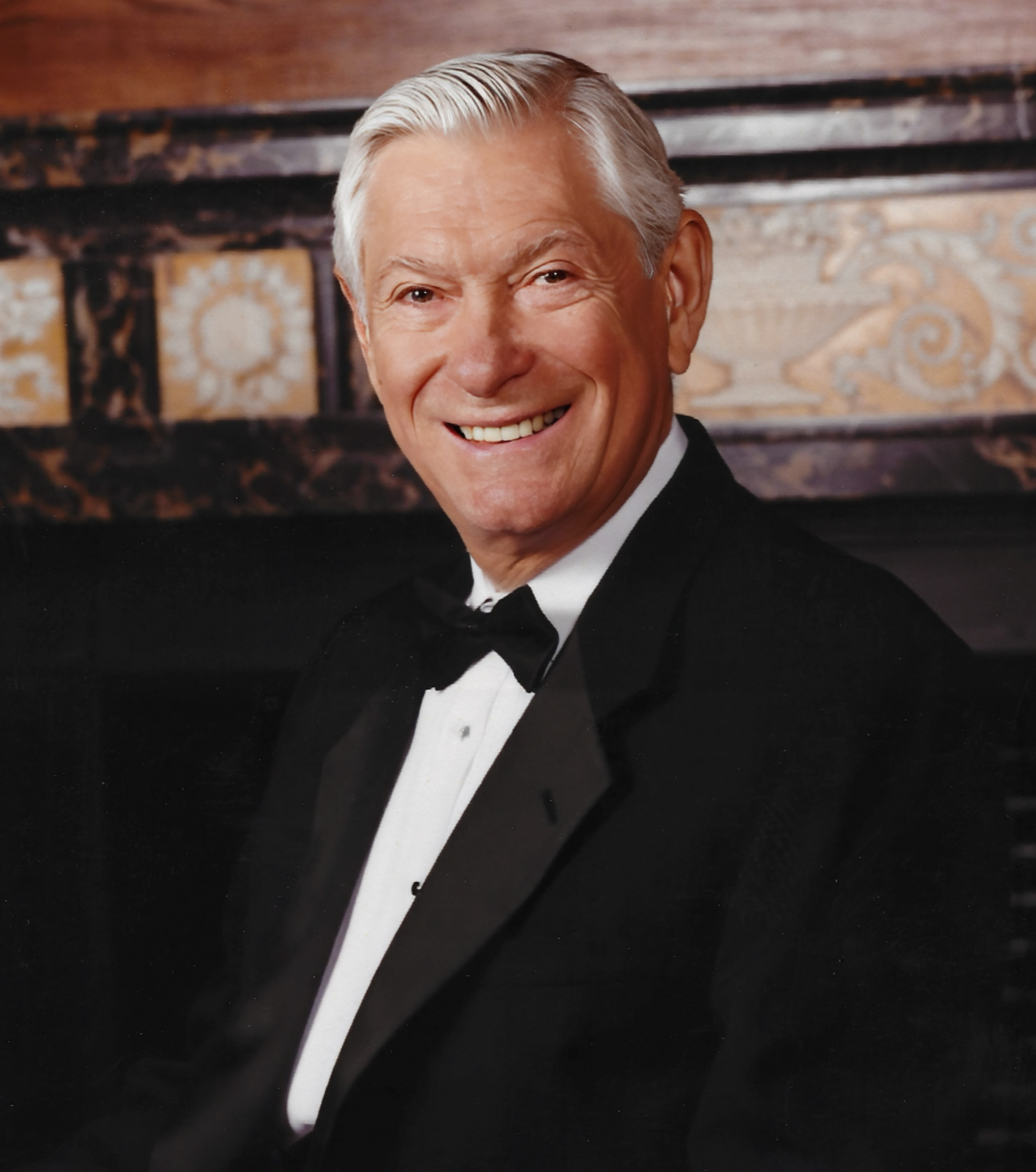
- Born: October 21, 1927
- Died: April 29, 2006 (aged 78)
- Occupation: psychologist
- Spouse: Anita Plutchik
- Children: Lori Plutchik, Lisa Silva, Roy Plutchik

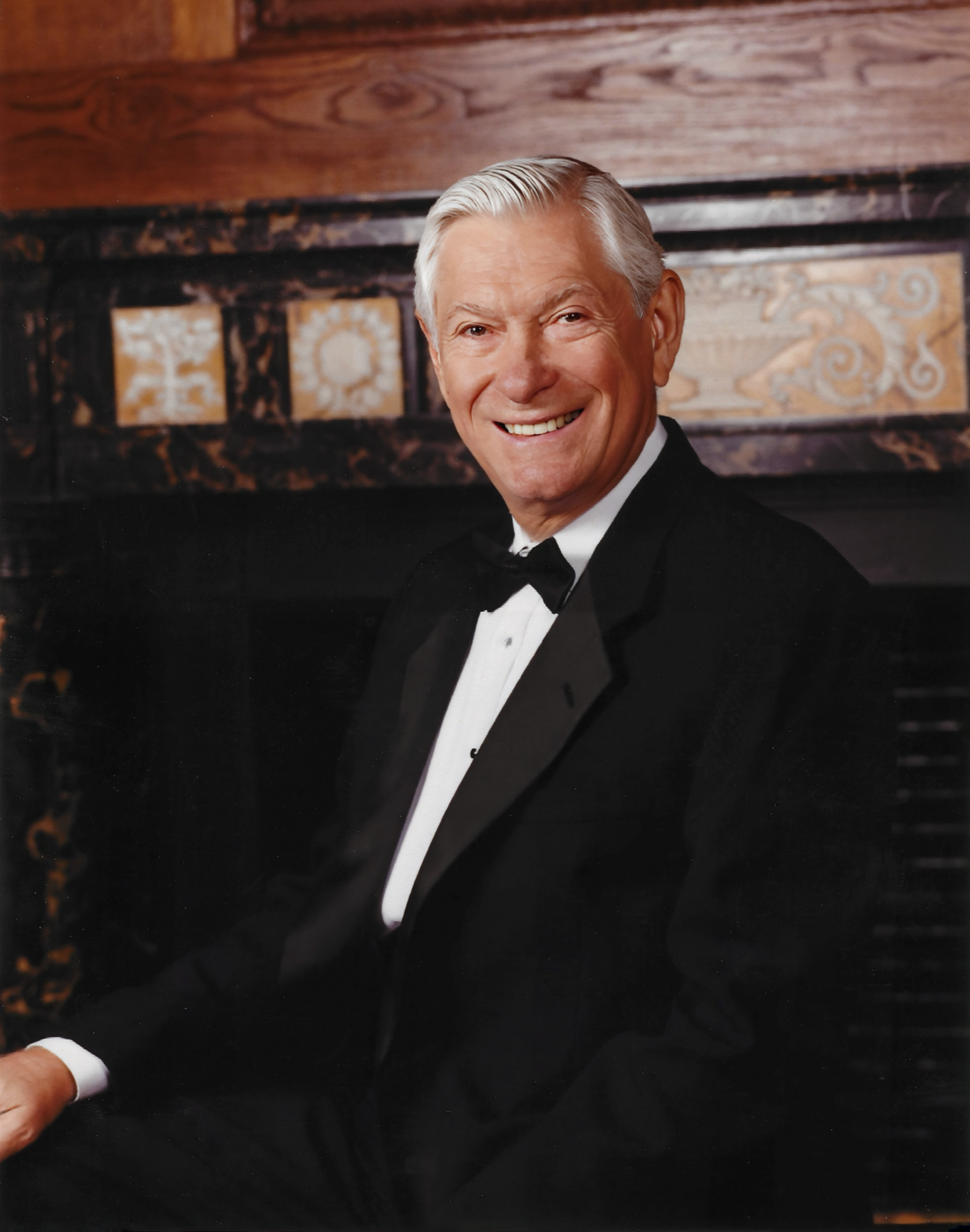
Robert Plutchik

Robert Plutchik (21 October 1927 – 29 April 2006) was an American psychologist who was professor emeritus at the Albert Einstein College of Medicine and adjunct professor at the University of South Florida. He received his Ph.D. from Columbia University. He authored or coauthored more than 260 articles, 45 chapters and eight books and edited seven books. His research interests included the study of emotions, the study of suicide and violence, and the study of the psychotherapy process.

== Early life and education ==
Plutchik was born in Brooklyn, New York on October 21, 1927, the son of Leon Plutchik (a tailor) and Libby (Solow) Plutchik. He earned a scholarship to City College of New York, graduating in 1949, and later completed his master’s (1950) and doctoral (1952) degrees at Columbia University.

== Career ==
During his career, Plutchik taught at several institutions, including Hofstra University (1951-1967), Columbia University (1967-1968), and Bronx State Hospital (1968-1971), eventually becoming a professor at the Albert Einstein College of Medicine in 1971 and later an adjunct professor at the University of South Florida. He was a fellow of the American Psychological Association and an active member of professional societies.

Plutchik published extensively, with an early book, The Emotions: Facts, Theories, and a New Model (1962), contributing significantly to the field when emotion research was still a niche interest. His later work, Emotions and Life: Perspectives From Psychology, Biology, and Evolution (2003), explored various aspects of emotions, from their expression and development to their neurological and social roles.

Among his major theoretical contributions, Plutchik proposed that emotions are evolutionary adaptations, serving essential survival functions and existing across species. He also introduced the idea that emotions form the basis of personality traits and psychiatric diagnoses. His model illustrated how primary emotions interact, influencing behavior and mental health.

Beyond academia, Plutchik was an artist, sculptor, and poet. His artistic works were compiled in World of Emotions: Poems, Etchings, and Sculptures by Robert Plutchik, published in 2006.

== Theory of emotion ==
Plutchik proposed a psychoevolutionary classification approach for general emotional responses. He identified eight primary emotions—anger, fear, sadness, disgust, surprise, anticipation, trust, and joy. Plutchik argues for the primacy of these emotions by showing each to be the trigger of behavior with high survival value, such as the way fear inspires the fight-or-flight response.

Plutchik's psychoevolutionary theory of basic emotions has ten postulates.

1. The concept of emotion is applicable to all evolutionary levels and applies to all animals including humans.
2. Emotions have an evolutionary history and have evolved various forms of expression in different species.
3. Emotions served an adaptive role in helping organisms deal with key survival issues posed by the environment.
4. Despite different forms of expression of emotions in different species, there are certain common elements, or prototype patterns, that can be identified.
5. There is a small number of basic, primary, or prototype emotions.
6. All other emotions are mixed or derivative states; that is, they occur as combinations, mixtures, or compounds of the primary emotions.
7. Primary emotions are hypothetical constructs or idealized states whose properties and characteristics can only be inferred from various kinds of evidence.
8. Primary emotions can be conceptualized in terms of pairs of polar opposites.
9. All emotions vary in their degree of similarity to one another.
10. Each emotion can exist in varying degrees of intensity or levels of arousal.

=== Plutchik's wheel of emotions ===
Plutchik's wheel of emotions, with intensity levels and dyads (combinations of two primary emotions)

Plutchik also created a wheel of emotions to illustrate different emotions. Plutchik first proposed his cone-shaped model (3D) or the wheel model (2D) in 1980 to describe how emotions were related.

He suggested eight primary bipolar emotions: joy versus sadness; anger versus fear; trust versus disgust; and surprise versus anticipation. Additionally, his circumplex model makes connections between the idea of an emotion circle and a color wheel. Like colors, primary emotions can be expressed at different intensities and can mix with one another to form different emotions.

The theory was extended to provide the basis for an explanation for psychological defence mechanisms; Plutchik proposed that eight defense mechanisms were manifestations of the eight core emotions.

The Complex, Probabilistic Sequence of Events Involved in the Development of an Emotion
Stimulus event	Inferred cognition	Feeling	Behavior	Effect
Threat	"Danger"	Fear, terror	Running, or flying away	Protection
Obstacle	"Enemy"	Anger, rage	Biting, hitting	Destruction
Potential mate	"Possess"	Joy, ecstasy	Courting, mating	Reproduction
Loss of valued person	"Isolation"	Sadness, grief	Crying for help	Reintegration
Group member	"Friend"	Acceptance, trust	Grooming, sharing	Affiliation
Gruesome object	"Poison"	Disgust, Loathing	Vomiting, pushing away	Rejection
New territory	"What's out there?"	Anticipation	Examining, mapping	Exploration
Sudden novel object	"What is it?"	Surprise	Stopping, alerting	Orientation

== Influence ==
Plutchik's model of emotion has been applied in psychological research, psychotherapy, marketing, artificial intelligence, and media studies.

=== Psychology and psychiatry ===
Plutchik argued that emotions have adaptive functions related to survival and developed a psychoevolutionary model to describe their relationships. His work was later applied in research on emotional processing and psychiatric disorders, including anxiety and depression.

Plutchik’s model has also been cited in research on emotion-focused therapy and the assessment of emotional responses. EFT practitioners use Plutchik’s framework to help clients navigate complex emotional experiences.

Plutchik's Emotions Profile Index (EPI) test is a relatively well known psychometric test. The subject selects among pairs of 12 self-describing adjectives and the investigator draws an eight-dimensional chart of the selected replies. This provides an insight into the basic personality traits and personality conflicts of the subject.

=== Applications beyond psychology ===
Plutchik's model has also been used outside psychology, including in:

- In artificial intelligence, the model has been used in sentiment analysis, chatbots, and affective computing.
- In marketing research, it has been applied to studies of brand attachment, advertising, and consumer decision-making.
- In media studies, it has been used in analyses of character development and the representation of emotion in storytelling.

Plutchik’s Wheel of Emotions and his evolutionary theory of emotion have been applied in psychology and neuroscience and have also been referenced in popular culture.

=== Inside Out ===
Commentators have connected Plutchik's psychoevolutionary model of basic emotions with Pixar's films Inside Out (2015) and Inside Out 2 (2024). Writing ahead of the first film's release, The Guardian described Inside Out as "based in part on Robert Plutchik’s psychoevolutionary theory of emotional relationships," noting the movie's personified core affects such as Disgust and Anger.

A 2024 article in The New York Times reported that Pixar's filmmakers drew on emotion graphics, including Plutchik’s "wheel of emotions," when developing the films. The article also described how educators, counselors, therapists, and caregivers use the films' personified emotions as a shared visual language for discussing feelings with young people.

A 2015 article in Forbes linked Inside Out's five emotion characters to Plutchik's wheel of emotions and used the film's depiction of memory to explain encoding, consolidation, and reconsolidation, as well as the interaction of the amygdala and hippocampus.

== Personal life and death ==
Plutchik married Anita Freyberg in 1962, and had three children, including Dr. Lori Plutchik, a board-certified New York City psychiatrist. He died on April 29, 2006, in Sarasota, Florida, at age 78.

== Publications ==
- Small Group Discussion in Orientation and Teaching (Putnam, 1959).
- The Emotions: Facts, Theories, and a New Model (Random House, 1962).
- Theories of Emotion (Academic Press, 1980).
- Emotion: A Psychoevolutionary Synthesis (Harper and Row, 1980).
- Foundations of Experimental Research (Harper and Row, 1983).
- Emotions in Early Development (Elsevier Science and Technology, 1983).
- Biological Foundations of Emotion (Elsevier Science and Technology, 1985).
- Emotion, Psychopathology, and Psychotherapy (Academic Press, 1989).
- The Measurement of Emotions (Elsevier Science and Technology, 1989).
- The Emotions (University Press of American, 1991).
- The Psychology and Biology of Emotion (Harper Collins, 1994).
- Emotions in the Practice of Psychotherapy: Clinical Implications of Affect Theories (American Psychological Association, 2000).
- Emotions and Life: Perspectives from Psychology, Biology, and Evolution (American Psychological Association, 2003).
