= Interest (emotion) =

Feeling that causes attention to focus on an object, event or process

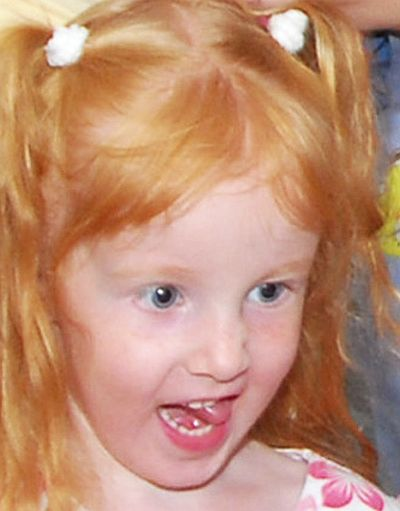
Facial expression of intense interest (emotion), which includes jaws being dropped, tongue being stuck upward and outward, and pupils being dilated

Interest is a feeling or emotion that causes attention to focus on an object, event, or process. In contemporary psychology of interest, the term is used as a general concept that may encompass other more specific psychological terms, such as curiosity and to a much lesser degree surprise.

The emotion of interest does have its own facial expression, of which the most prominent component is having dilated pupils.

== Applications in computer assisted communication and B-C interface ==
In 2016, an entirely new communication device and brain-computer interface was revealed, which required no visual fixation or eye movement at all, as with previous such devices. Instead, the device assesses more covert interest, that is by assessing other indicators than eye fixation, on a chosen letter on a virtual keyboard. Each letter has its own (background) circle that is micro-oscillating in brightness in different time transitions, where the determination of letter selection is based on the best fit between first, unintentional pupil-size oscillation pattern and second, the circle-in-background's brightness oscillation pattern. Accuracy is additionally improved by the user's mental rehearsing of the words 'bright' and 'dark' in synchrony with the brightness transitions of the circle/letter.

== Measurement of sexual interest ==
In social science measurement methodology, when the intensity of (sexual) interest needs to be measured, the changes in pupil size – despite its weaker, but still consistent, correlations with other measures such as self-reported measures of sexual interest's orientation – have been proposed as its appropriate measure.

== Interestingness in science ==
In science, an observation is judged interesting if it questions some taken-for-granted assumptions of the audience. Studies which denies all of the audience's assumptions may be seen as irrelevant or absurd. The studies « that challenge some, but not all, of the readers' assumptions that will be regarded as interesting and important. ». What is interesting for someone may be trivial for someone else as each audience may have a different "starting point". Interestingness cannot be substitute for validity in determining if a scientific claim is true. However, it contribute to motivate the audience to read and learn from the published material.

== See also ==
- Curiosity
- Ecstasy (emotion)
- Carroll Izard
- Surprise
- Attraction (emotion)
