= Carroll Izard =

American psychologist

- Born: Carroll Ellis Izard; October 8, 1923
- Died: February 5, 2017 (aged 93)
- Citizenship: American
- Education: Syracuse University
- Known for: Differential Emotions universally discernible in the facial expressions of infants; Maximally Discriminative Affect Coding System (MAX); Differential Emotions Scale (DES-IV)
- Scientific career
- Fields: Psychology of Affects (emotional development in children)
- Workplaces: University of Delaware; Vanderbilt University

Carroll Ellis Izard (October 8, 1923 – February 5, 2017) was an American research psychologist known for his contributions to differential emotions theory (DET), and the Maximally Discriminative Affect Coding System (MAX) on which he worked with Paul Ekman. Izard also undertook empirical studies into the facial feedback hypothesis according to which emotions which have different functions also cause facial expressions which in turn provide us with cues about what emotion a person is feeling. In addition, Izard constructed a multidimensional self-report measure – the Differential Emotions Scale – currently in its 4th edition (DES-IV). His later research focused on emotional development in young children and the development and testing of his Emotions Course for Young Children.

== Academic career ==
Izard earned his PhD from Syracuse University in 1952 and served initially as a psychology professor at Vanderbilt University, where he carried out pioneering research into human emotions. In 1976, he joined the Department of Psychology at the University of Delaware, where he remained active as Unidel Foundation Professor of Psychology in the McKinly Lab until his retirement in 2014. A festschrift was held at the University of Delaware on October 22, 2012, to celebrate Izard's lifelong contributions to the understanding of human emotional development.

== Works ==
Izard is noted for contributions to the developmental research on emotion. In 1971, Izard - along with colleagues - conducted groundbreaking research on this subject, which challenged the then established theory that emotions were undifferentiated and also validated universally recognizable expressions. He also defined personality as an interrelated system and that emotion is one of the core components that also include homoeostatic, motor, perceptual, and cognitive systems. As many experts maintain that emotions unfold gradually alongside the development of the nervous system, Izard maintained that even infants who are 10 weeks old are capable of several basic emotions. Izard's 1977 theory of emotion identified ten primary and discrete emotions: fear, anger, shame, contempt, disgust, guilt, distress, interest, surprise, and joy. One of Izard's major theoretical competitors, Robert Plutchik, proposed that all the distinctive emotions Izard put forth were primary except shame and guilt. Izard postulated that these ten fundamental emotions cannot be reduced to more basic emotions but can be combined to produce other emotions, just like primary colors could be combined to create different colors. He theorized that each emotion was an intra-individual process or a conscious feeling state marked by its neurobiological activity and expression pattern like distinct facial expressions. Izard's theory of emotion is also called differential emotions theory. Izard proposed that these specific emotions would emerge in a child not because of social learning but as adaptive behavior.

== Books ==
- Face of Emotion. (1993). Irvington Publishers.
- The Psychology of Emotions. (1991). New York: Plenum.
- Human Emotions. (1977). New York: Plenum.
- Patterns of Emotions: A New Analysis of Anxiety and Depression. (1972). New York: Academic.
- The Face of Emotion. (1971). New York: Appleton-Century-Crofts.
- Depression in Young People: Developmental and Clinical Perspectives. (1985). Guilford. (with Michael Rutter)
- Emotions, Cognition and Behavior. (1984). Cambridge University Press. (with Jerome Kagan)
- Measuring Emotions in Infants and Children: Vol. 1. (1982). Cambridge University Press.

== See also ==
- Discrete emotion theory
- Basic emotions
- Emotion classification

== Sources ==
- Cicchetti, D. (2015). Reflections on Carroll Izard's contributions: Influences on diverse scientific disciplines and personal reflections. Emotion Review, 7(2), 104–109. doi: 10.1177/1754073914554781
- Hope, D. A. (1996). (Ed.), Perspectives on Anxiety, Panic, and Fear. Nebraska Symposium on Motivation: Current Theory and Research in Motivation (Vol. 43). Lincoln, NE: University of Nebraska Press. ISBN 0-8032-2382-X
- Deci, E. L., & Ryan, R. M. (1985). Intrinsic Motivation and Self-determination in Human Behavior. New York: Plenum. ISBN 0-306-42022-8
