= Surprise =

Emotional state experienced as the result of an unexpected event

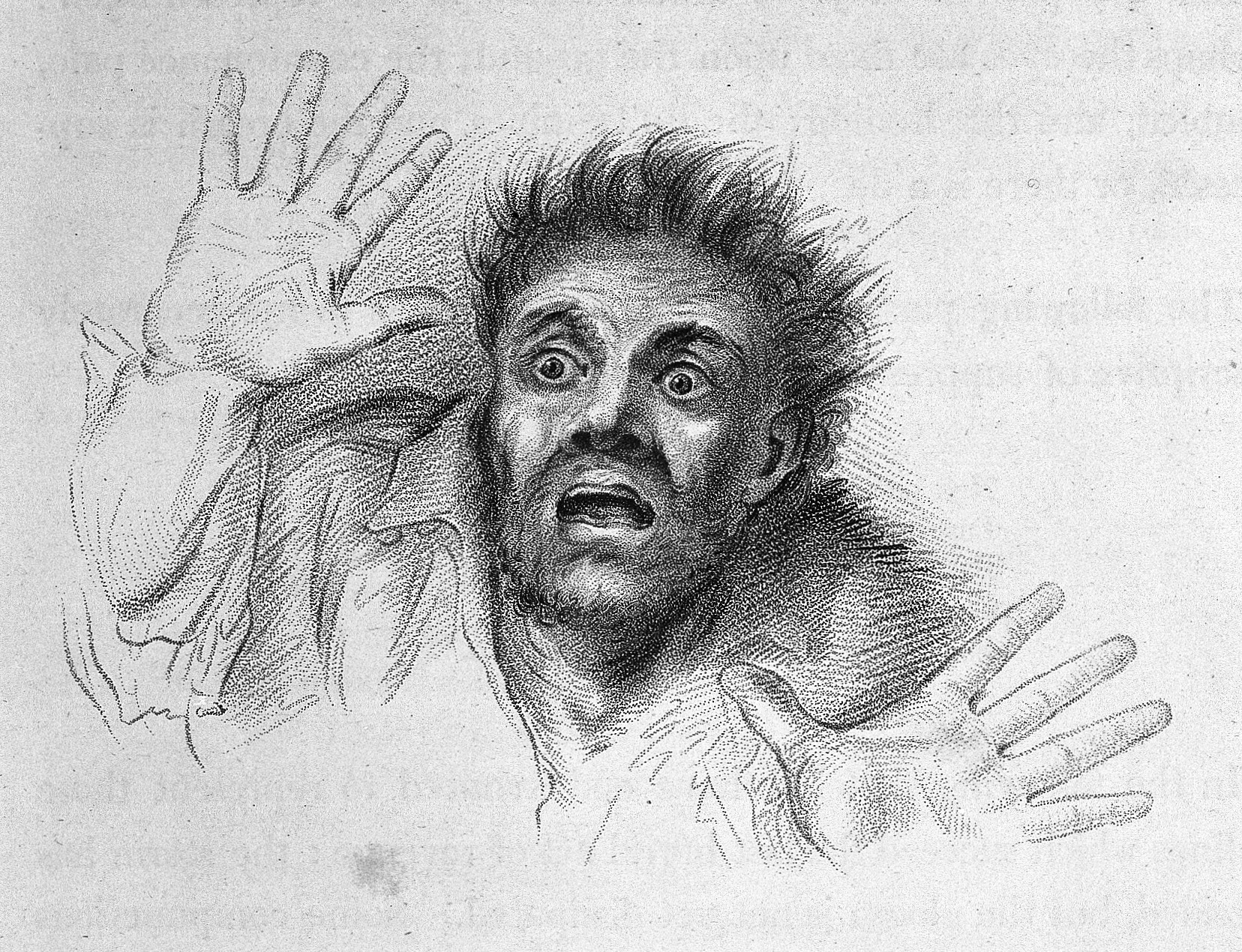
Facial expressions of astonishment

Surprise (sə(r)ˈprīz) is a rapid, fleeting mental and physiological state. It is related to the startle response experienced by animals and humans as the result of an unexpected event.

Surprise can have any valence. That is, it can be pleasant/positive, unpleasant/negative, or neutral/moderate. Surprise can occur in varying levels of intensity ranging from very surprised, which may induce the fight-or-flight response, or slightly surprised, which elicits a less intense response to the stimulus.

Surprise is included as a primary or basic emotion in the taxonomies of Carroll Izard and Paul Ekman. According to these perspectives, surprise is evolutionarily adaptive, and also innate and universal across human cultures.

== Causes ==
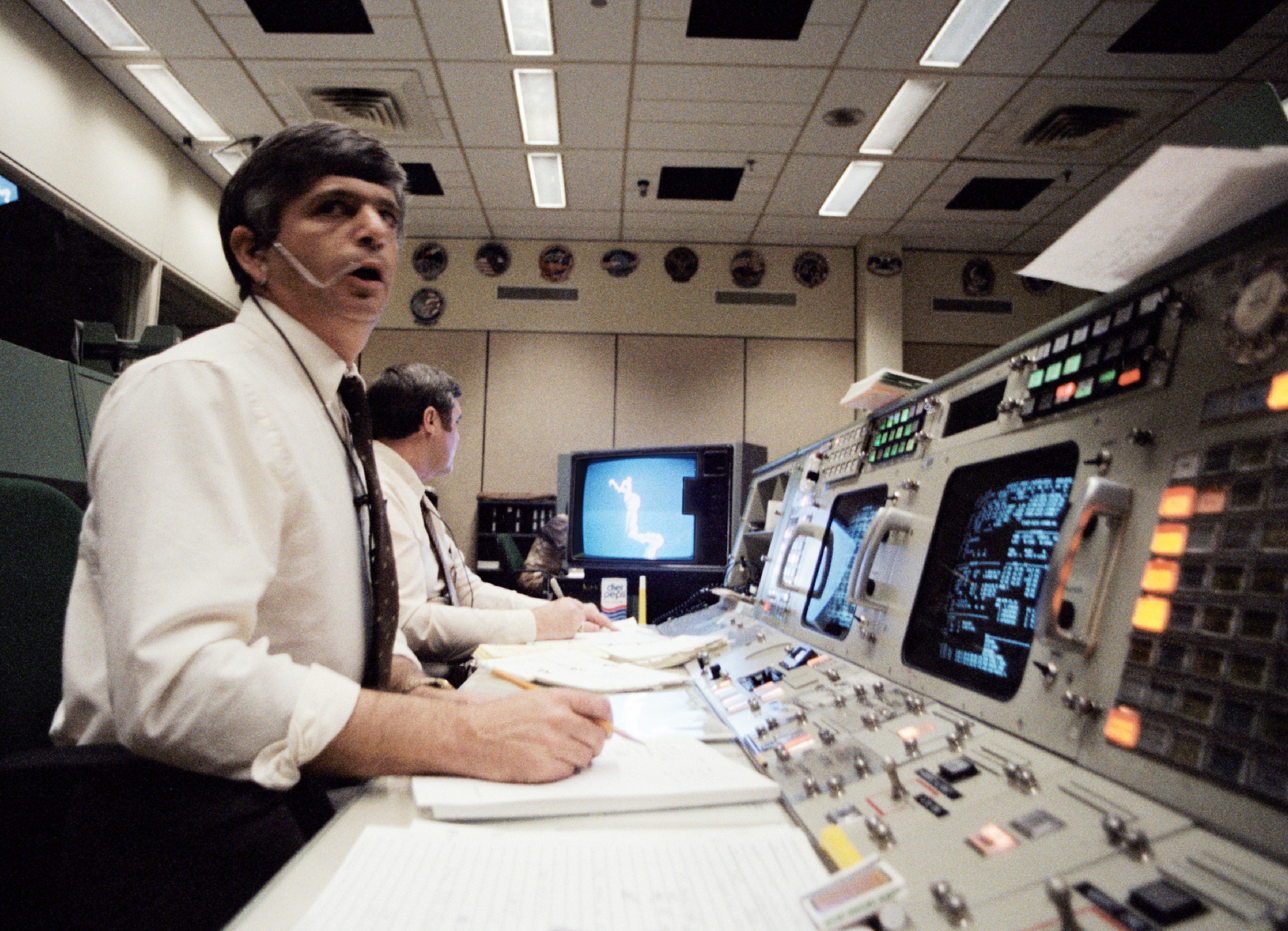
A surprised NASA Engineer Jay Greene. Photo taken after the destruction of the Challenger Space shuttle in 1986

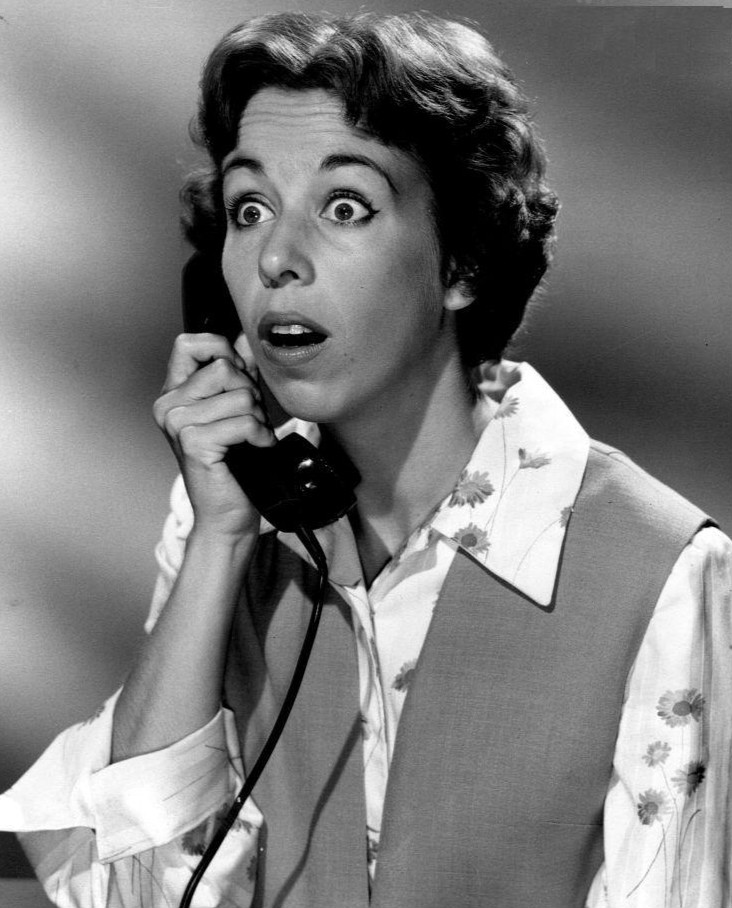
Comedian Carol Burnett looking surprised

Surprise is intimately connected to the idea of acting in accordance with a set of rules. When the rules of reality generating events of daily life separate from the rule-of-thumb expectations, surprise is the outcome. Surprise represents the difference between expectations and reality, the gap between our assumptions and expectations about worldly events and the way that those events actually turn out. This gap can be deemed an important foundation on which new findings are based since surprises can make people aware of their own ignorance. The acknowledgement of ignorance, in turn, can mean a window to new knowledge.

Surprise can also occur due to a violation of expectancies. In the specific case of interpersonal communication, the Expectancy Violation Theory (EVT) says that three factors influence a person's expectations: interactant variables, environmental variables, and variables related to the nature of the interaction or environmental variables.

- Interactant variables involve traits of the persons involved in the communication and in this instance the communication leading to surprise, including: sex, socio-economic status, age, race, and appearance.
- Environmental variables that effect the communication of surprise include: proxemics, chronemics, and the nature of the surroundings of the interaction.
- Interaction variables that influence surprise include: social norms, cultural norms, physiological influences, biological influences and unique individual behavioral patterns.

Surprise may occur due to a violation of one, two, or a combination of all three factors.

Surprise does not always have to have a negative valence. EVT proposes that expectancy's will influence the outcome of the communication as a confirmation, behaviors within the expected range, or violation, behaviors outside the expected range. EVT also postulates that positive interactions will increase the level of attraction of the violator, whereas negative violations decrease the attraction. Positive violations would then cause positive surprise, such as a surprise birthday party, and negative violations would cause negative surprise, such as a parking ticket. Positive violations may enhance credibility, power, attraction, and persuasiveness. Negative violations may reduce them.

== Physiological responses ==
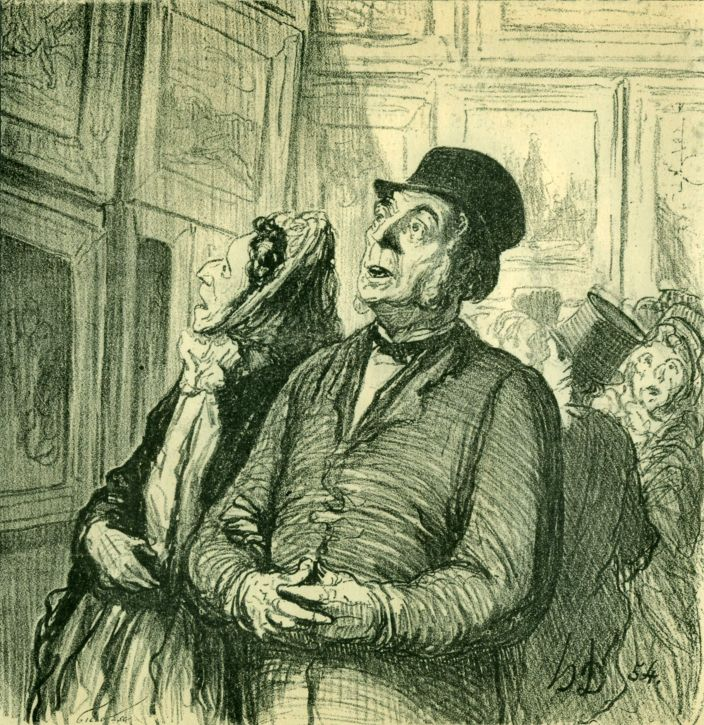
Sunday at the Museum, Honoré Daumier

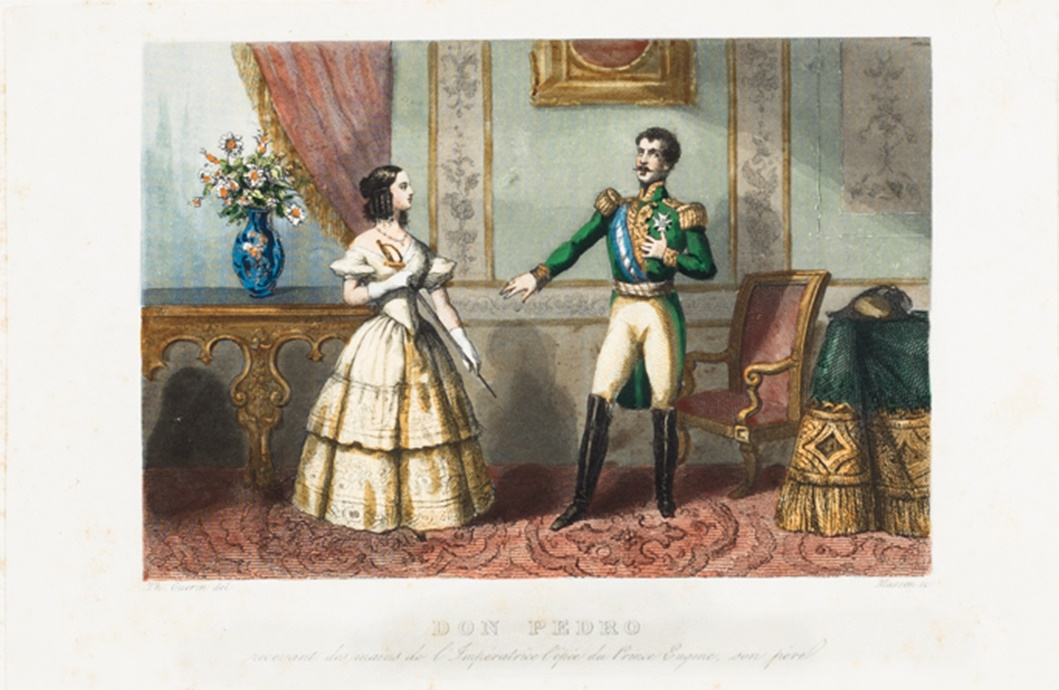
Emperor Pedro I of Brazil exhibiting surprise as his wife, Amélie, presents him with the sword of her father, Eugène de Beauharnais, the stepson of Napoleon Bonaparte

The physiological response of surprise falls under the category of the startle response. The main function of surprise or the startle response is to interrupt an ongoing action and reorient attention to a new, possibly significant event. There is an automatic redirection of focus to the new stimuli and, for a brief moment, this causes tenseness in the muscles, especially the neck muscles. Studies show that this response happens extremely fast, with information (in this case a loud noise) reaching the pons within 3 to 8 ms and the full startle reflex occurring in less than two tenths of a second.

If the startle response is strongly elicited through surprise then it will bring on the fight-or-flight response, which is a perceived harmful event, attack, or threat to survival that causes a release of adrenaline for a boost of energy as a means to escape or fight. This response generally has a negative valence in terms of surprise.

Surprise has one core appraisal — appraising something as new and unexpected — but new appraisals can shift the experience of surprise to another. Appraising an event as new predicts surprise, but the appraisal of the coping mechanism predicts the response beyond surprise, such as confusion or interest.

== Non-verbal responses ==
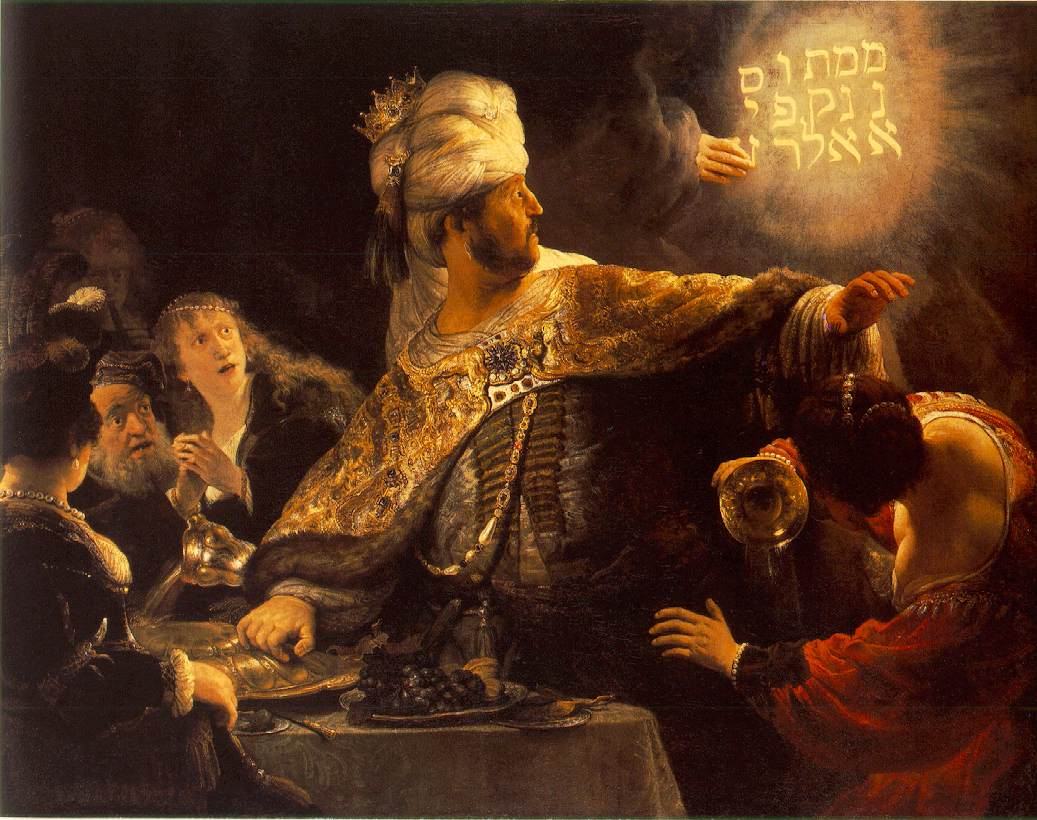
Belshazzar's Feast, by Rembrandt

Surprise is expressed in the face by the following features:

- Eyebrows that are raised so they become curved and high.
- Horizontal wrinkles across the forehead.
- Open eyelids: the upper lid is raised and the lower lid is drawn down, often exposing the white sclera above and below the iris.
- Pupil dilation mydriasis or pupil constriction miosis
- Dropped jaw so that the lips and teeth are parted, with no tension around the mouth.

Spontaneous, involuntary surprise is often expressed for only a fraction of a second. It may be followed immediately by the emotion of fear, joy or confusion. The intensity of the surprise is associated with how much the jaw drops, but the mouth may not open at all in some cases. The raising of the eyebrows, at least momentarily, is the most distinctive and predictable sign of surprise.

Despite the facial feedback hypothesis (that facial display is necessary in the experience of emotion or a major determinant of feelings), in the case of surprise, some research has shown a strong lack of connection between the facial display of surprise and the actual experience of surprise. This suggests that there are variations in the expression of surprise. It has been suggested that surprise is an envelope term for both the startle response and also disbelief. More recent research shows that raising of the eyebrows does provide facial feedback to disbelief but not to the startle.

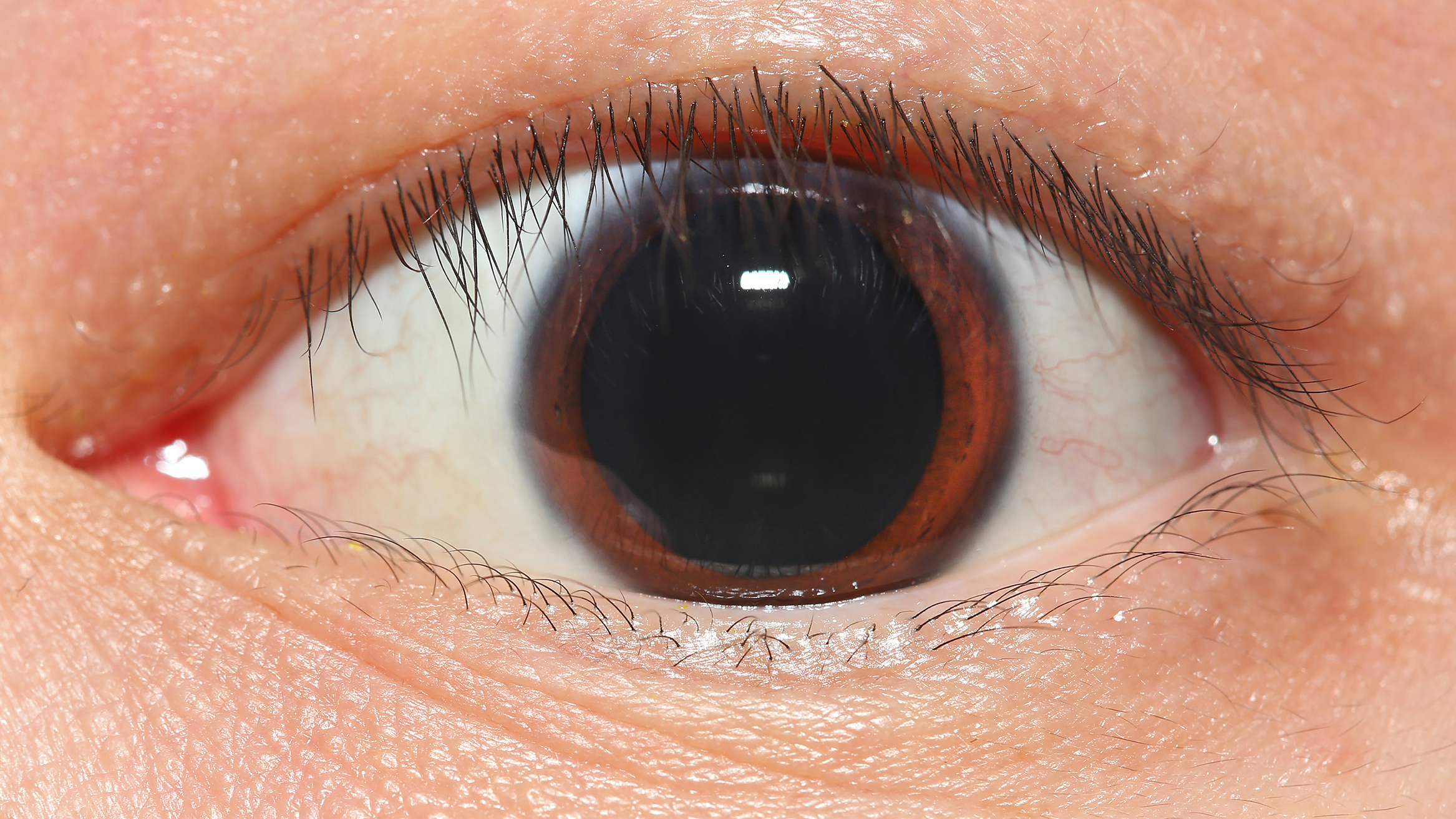
Widening (dilation) of the pupils is a non-verbal response to surprise.

Pupil dilation and constriction can determine the valence of surprise from the action to the reaction of the individual. Positive valence to surprise is shown through a dilation or expansion of the pupil, where as negative valence in surprise is associated with pupil constriction. But, newer studies show pupil dilation for negative as well as positive stimuli, indicating a general autonomous arousal associated with pupil dilation and not affective valence.

Non-verbal responses to surprise can also be affected by voice inflection, distance, time, environment, volume, rate, quality, pitch, speaking style, and even the level of eye contact made by an individual trying to cause a surprise. These non-verbal cues help to define whether the perceived surprise will have a positive or negative valence and to what degree the surprise will be induced by the individual.

== Verbal responses ==
Linguistics may play a role in the formulation of surprise. The language expectancy theory (LET) states that people develop norms and expectations concerning appropriate usage of a language in a given situation. When norms or expectations of verbal language are violated surprise may occur. The EVT model supports that expectations can be violated verbally and this violation may cause a surprise within the individual. Expectations of verbal language that may lead to surprise may include but are not limited to, expletives, shouts, screams, and gasps.

The aforementioned expectations of verbal language are more closely associated to negative expectancies of surprise, but positive surprise can occur from verbal interaction as well. A positive violation of expectations that could result in a positive surprise may include a low credibility source making a persuasive argument that leads to the change of beliefs or emotions thus enhancing the speaker's credibility. The move from a low credibility source to a high credibility source can elicit a positive surprise among individuals. The act of being persuaded by said speaker can also elicit a positive surprise, as an individual may have perceived the speaker as having too low of a credibility to elicit change and the change of beliefs or emotion then causes surprise.

Some languages have dedicated constructions used to express that something is surprising to the speaker; this grammatical category is called mirativity.

== Familiarity ==
As individuals become more accustomed to particular types of surprise, over time the level of surprise will decrease in intensity. This does not necessarily mean that an individual, for instance, will not be surprised during the jump scene of a scary movie, it implies that the individual may expect the jump scene due to familiarity with scary movies, thus lowering the level of surprise. The EVT model helps to support this claim because as individuals become more accustomed to a situation or communication, it becomes less and less likely that the situation or communication will cause a violation of expectation, and without violating an expectation, surprise cannot occur.

== See also ==
- Affective neuroscience
- Nihil admirari
