= Joanne Trattoria Cookbook =

2016 cookbook by Joe Germanotta

- Author: Joe Germanotta
- Cover artist: Greg Johnson
- Genre: Cookbook
- Publisher: Post Hill Press
- Publication date: November 22, 2016
- Publication place: United States
- Media type: Print (hardcover)
- Pages: 112
- ISBN: 978-1-68261-258-3
- OCLC: 956959551

Joanne Trattoria Cookbook: Classic Recipes and Scenes from an Italian American Restaurant is a cookbook written by Joe Germanotta, father of American singer Lady Gaga (who wrote the foreword) and owner of the New York City restaurant Joanne Trattoria. It was released on November 22, 2016, by Post Hill Press.

== Background ==
American singer Lady Gaga's aunt, Joanne Stefani Germanotta, died in 1974, when she was 19, due to complications arising from lupus. Although the singer was born almost 12 years after Joanne's death, the latter's influence was predominant on the Germanotta family and Gaga's work, including naming her fifth studio album as Joanne. Joanne Trattoria, an Italian restaurant located at West 68th Street in New York City, was opened in January 2012 by Gaga. The restaurant is co-owned by Gaga's parents, Joe and Cynthia Germanotta. Chef Art Smith had met Gaga during a taping of The Oprah Winfrey Show, and partnered with Gaga for working in the restaurant. The New York Times described the place as having a "well-stocked bar, a cozy back patio and seating for about 70 people". A long dream of Joe Germanotta, the restaurant serves Southern Italian cuisine. Decor of the jaunt consists of scenes of the Tuscan countryside, and near a fireplace at the entrance, diners can see the Germanotta family photos hanging by a front booth.

== Release ==
In August 2016, Post Hill Press announced the release of a cookbook authored by Germanotta, titled Joanne Trattoria Cookbook: Classic Recipes and Scenes from an Italian American Restaurant. The book was released by the publishing house on November 22, 2016, in hardcover format. Germanotta said that he had no inkling of what the process of writing a book consisted of, and had to learn each step, including how to promote it. Joanne Trattoria Cookbook consists of recipes for the dishes served in the restaurant—like Joanne's Meatballs, Papa G's Chicken Scarpariello, and Nutellasagna—along with anecdotes and family stories about the Germanottas. Sixteen pages of color photographs are present along with black and white ones, including pictures of Gaga in her high school. Post Hill Press described the book's premise as "Family, food, and love are the foundation upon which Joe and his wife, Cynthia, raised their daughters, Natali and Stefani". According to Jeanette Settembre from New York Daily News, the title of the book referenced singer Billy Joel's 1977 song, "Scenes from an Italian Restaurant", from his fifth studio album The Stranger.

== Content ==
The book begins with a foreword written by Gaga, and Wenonah Hoye as a guest contributor. New York Daily News published an excerpt from the foreword, with Gaga writing about having dinner as a family every night. "The smell of a pot of fresh ‘gravy’ is one of the fondest memories I have from my childhood. We would say a prayer and then eat as a family. We ended each prayer in memory of Joanne, whose name has become the symbol of both of our family's majestic accomplishments and of our losses along the way," Gaga's foreword explained.

Germanotta then writes an introduction titled Where Everybody Knows Your Name; in the piece he reminisces about his dreams as a kid of setting up his own restaurant, how he set up his business ventures, how sad he was to see his old eateries in New York being shut down, as well as how Joanne Trattoria was set up. The book offers 30 recipes from the restaurants, divided into seven chapters titled Gravy, Antipasti, Entrées, Thanksgiving Dinner, Salads, Desserts and Cocktails. The recipes gives a description of the dish to be prepared, lists the number of people to be served, and has extra footnotes, explaining important points to be considered while cooking. Interspersed between the recipes are the pictures and the Germanotta family stories, anecdotes and drawings.

== See also ==
- Italian cuisine
- List of restaurants in New York City
