= Germanotta =

Germanotta is an Italian surname. Notable people with the surname include:

- Cynthia Germanotta (born 1954), American philanthropist, activist, and entrepreneur
- Lady Gaga (born Stefani Germanotta; 1986), American singer, songwriter, and actress; daughter of Cynthia
