= Airport privacy =

Right of personal privacy for airport passengers

Airport privacy involves the right of personal privacy for passengers when it comes to screening procedures, surveillance, and personal data being stored at airports. This practice intertwines airport security measures and privacy specifically the advancement of security measures following the 9/11 attacks in the United States and other global terrorist attacks. Several terrorist attacks, such as 9/11, have led airports all over the world to look to the advancement of new technology such as body and baggage screening, detection dogs, facial recognition, and the use of biometrics in electronic passports. Amidst the introduction of new technology and security measures in airports and the growing rates of travelers there has been a rise of risk and concern in privacy.

== History of airport policies ==
Before the 9/11 terrorist attacks, the only security measure in place in U.S. airports were metal detectors. A metal detector's ability to only detect metal weapons made it inefficient in detecting nonmetal sharp objects, liquids, or explosives. After the 9/11 terrorist attacks in the United States, the Transportation Security Administration (TSA) increased airport security measures. Policies were made to restrict liquids and sharp objects, and prohibit explosives in baggage. Airlines instructed passengers to arrive 2 hours before their flight is to depart if traveling domestically and 3 hours if traveling internationally. After passing through screening, passengers were selected at random for additional screening including bag checks. After an incident, that involved a passenger carrying a bomb in their shoe, security agents asked passengers to remove their shoes when passing through checkpoints. In February 2002, the TSA officially took over the responsibility for airport security. In 2009, airport security measures were once again shaken when a passenger, now commonly known as the "underwear bomber," smuggled a bomb into the airport facility in his underwear. Before these terrorist attacks, only 5 percent of bags were screened. Following those attacks, all bags are now subject to screening.

In 2008, the European Union considered the use of full body scanners to overcome the challenge of metal detectors not being able to detect nonmetal weapons and also the challenge of pat-downs. The European commission came to the consensus that passengers must have an option to decline body scanning.

== Technology and privacy ==
=== Body screening ===
Screening Technology has advanced to detect any harmful materials under a traveler's clothes and also detect any harmful materials that may have been consumed internally. Full body scanners or Advanced Imaging Technology (AIT) were introduced to U.S. Airports in 2006. Two types of body screening that are currently being used at all airports internationally are backscatters and millimeter wave scanners. Backscatters use a high-speed yet thin intensity x-ray beam to portray the digital image of an individual's body. Millimeter wave scanners uses the millimeter waves to create a 3D image based on the energy reflected from the individual's body.

In June 2010, the TSA's commissioners report regulated that screening must follow a framework to ensure fundamental rights and health provisions for travelers. Members of particular groups including disabled people, transgender people, older people, children, women and religious groups have experienced additional negative effects on privacy. On April 15, 2010, a letter from the TSA stated that they had in their possession about 2000 body scanned photos from devices that they claimed were unable to store data/images.

Alternative security measures are offered to travelers who wish to opt out-of-body screening. The United States and European Union allow a traveler the option of refusing screening procedures and instead go through a pat-down. However, if a traveler refuses the pat-down then they are refused entry to the secure area of the airport terminal.

=== Baggage screening ===
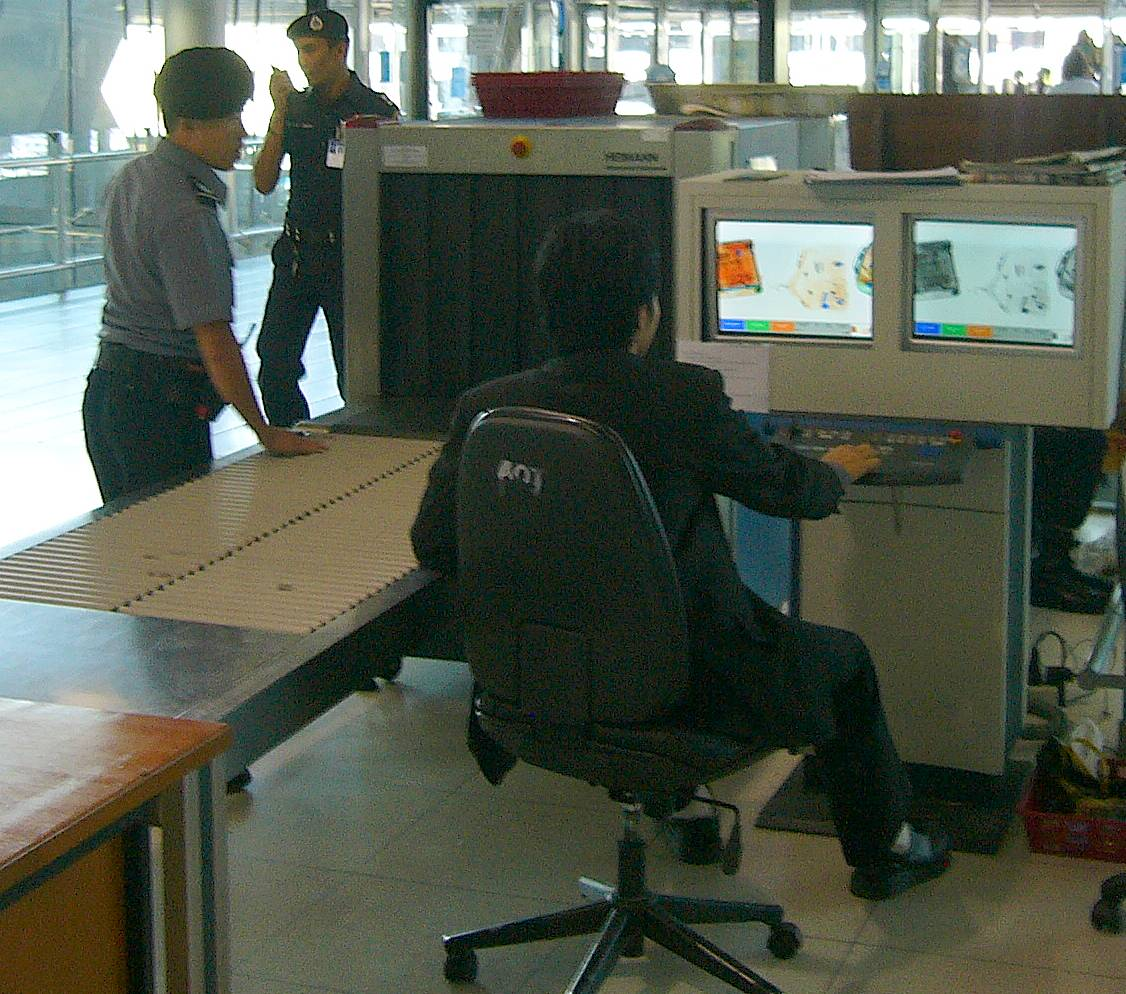
Baggage screening conducted by a TSA official

Baggage screening of all bags entering the airport wasn't implemented until after the 9/11 terrorist attacks. Carry on bags typically go through two stages of inspection: an X-ray screening of the contents in the bag and a manual inspection by a Security Screening Operator (SSO). A manual inspection is only necessary if a SSO has doubts of the contents in the bags. After security checkpoints, carry on bags can be inspected further through random searches and checked in bags are screened for explosives or other dangerous items before being sent out to a passenger's respective flight.

=== Sniffer dogs/detection dogs ===
Detection dogs are utilized all over airports specifically in baggage claim sections. The role of a detection dog is to prevent any substance such as illegal drugs or explosives to further enter the facility or leave it. The accuracy and physical capacity of these dogs has raised concerns and has led to the creation of sniffer devices. Similarly to dogs, this device also known as "chemical sniffers" or "electronic noses" is used to detect any trace of drugs and explosives. Odor, although not commonly thought to be connected with an individual's privacy, is unique to every individual. Every individual has a characteristic odor known as the “body odor signature” which can be used to identify gender, sexual orientation, health, diet, and so on. It can reveal emotions like fear and happiness and is viewed as a biological footprint.

In the Lopez Ostra v Spain, the European Court of Human Rights ruled that odor does in fact have an effect on privacy and human rights.

=== Camera surveillance and the future of facial recognition ===
Surveillance cameras are placed strategically around airports to ensure the safety of everyone. An increase in camera surveillance then calls for an increase amount of personally stored data. A human machine interface is controlled by a person who operates the surveillance system to assess a situation. The operator is in control of the cameras and determines where the person will appear on the next camera. Facial recognition is an emerging technology measure for airport security. Facial recognition has made its way to camera surveillance. A study done at The Palm Beach airport showed that the false alarm rate of face recognition surveillance was fairly low and had a success rate of almost 50% when it came to matching. The use of facial recognition during the Super Bowl brought up concerns in connection to the Fourth Amendment.

=== Facial profiling ===
In 2003, in an effort to improve the detection of terrorist threat, the TSA introduced the Screening Passengers by Observation Technique (SPOT). SPOT is a behavioral recognition system that looks at the way people conduct themselves through facial expressions and body movement. TSA Behavior Detection Officers (TBO) are stationed at airport security checkpoints and keep an eye out for behavior from travelers that may give off any suspicion of malice. SPOT has been highly critiqued for the times it has been used to misidentify a threat causing intrusive searches on travelers based on a hunch that a TSA official has.

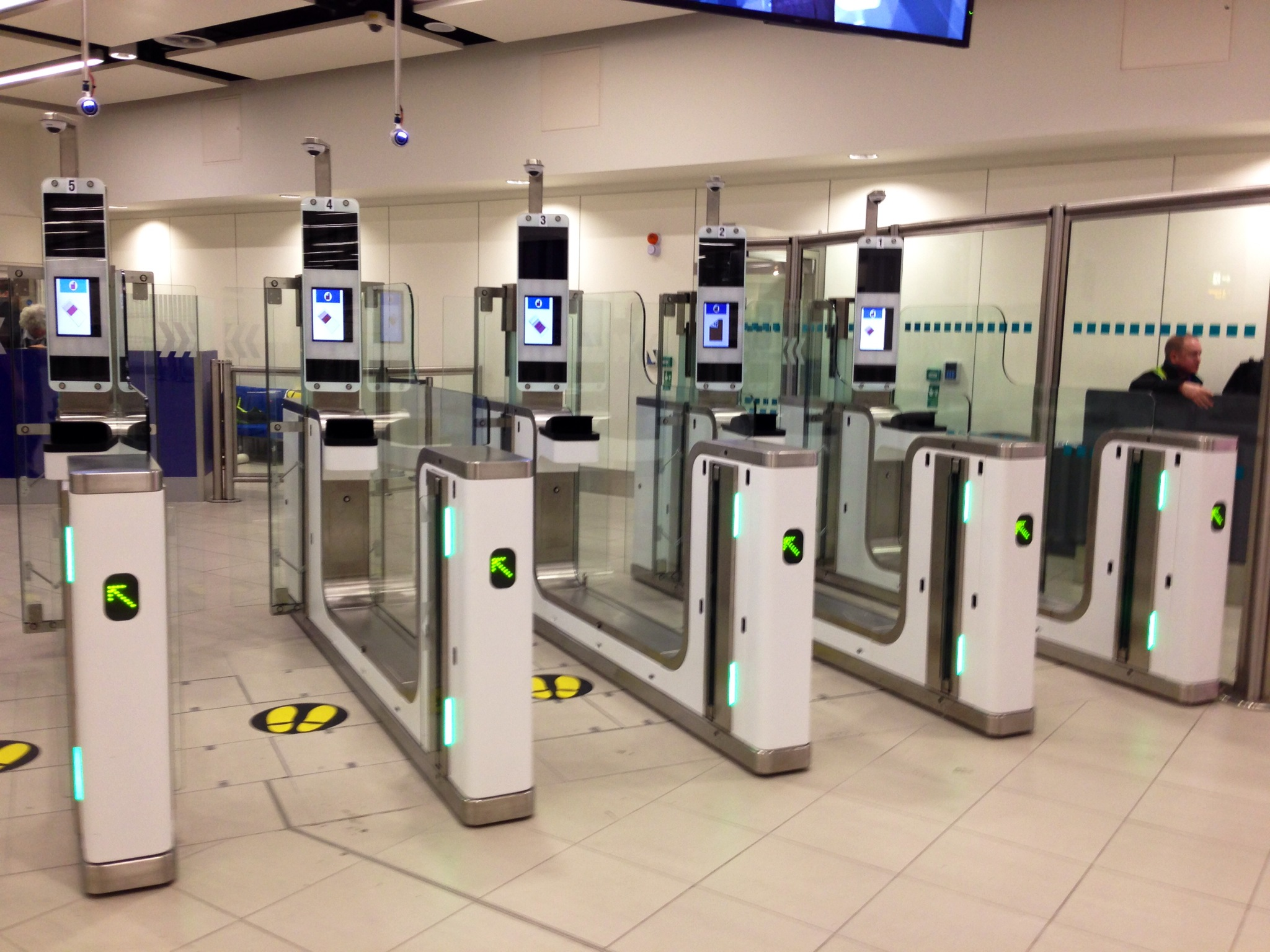
eGates (Automated Border Control) in Gatwick South terminal

=== Biometric systems ===
Biometrics are human characteristics that are unique to every individual and that usually do not change such as fingerprints, speech, face, etc. Electronic gates, also known as e-gates, have become very common in airports because of their ability to verify travelers based on their biometric information. There are two types of privacy concerns when discussing e-gates, one is general privacy and the other is system-specific privacy. System-specific privacy focuses on beliefs regarding the capability of the system to protect privacy. Europe is the first to have introduced e-gates in their airport facilities, and the future of airport technology for the United States points toward e-gates.

In the United States, there are two registered travel programs: the Register Travel (RT) system and the Global Entry (GE) System. These programs are designed to expedite immigration procedures for trusted travelers and are primarily based on fingerprint recognition. Beyond the security benefits, According to Department of Homeland Security GE Systems have proven to reduce wait time by 70% and almost no paperwork.

== Legality and precedence ==
=== The Fourth Amendment ===
The Fourth Amendment prohibits unreasonable searches and seizures while also ensuring the protection of an individual's privacy. The relationship between airport security measures such as screening and pat-downs has sparked a controversial debate when it comes to the Fourth Amendment. As security measures heightened following the 9/11 attacks, many travelers have voiced their opinion that these new measures are in violation of the Fourth Amendment. However, airport officials have responded by claiming that screening measures and pat-downs are not seen to violate the Fourth Amendment because these procedures can be made into a condition when a traveler is purchasing airline tickets. In addition, the Fourth Amendment does not create an absolute right to privacy against all intrusive searches instead the constitutionality of a search is highly based on reasonableness and security.

The Privacy Act of 1974 protects personal information when it is being processed by the federal government.

The following cases provide examples to court rulings on intrusive searches:

=== United States v. Montoya de Hernandez ===
United States v. Montoya de Hernandez (1985) ruled that an individual can be subject to an intrusive search, such as a body cavity, if authorities see it fit for the safety of others or themselves. This ruling coincides with the fact that a person is subject to additional screening at any point throughout the airport if airport authorities feel it is necessary or suspect the risk of safety.

=== Illinois v. Caballes and United States v. Place ===
The US Supreme Court ruled in Illinois v. Caballes (2005) and United States v. Place (1983) that warrantless searches such as dog searches can be acted upon an individual without the need of suspicion. In airports, detection dogs conduct searches on passengers throughout the facility by having them sniff on a passenger's baggage at baggage claim sections.

=== United States v. Guapi ===
United States v. Guapi (1998) ruled that the police did not effectively communicate that the search was optional to the suspect. This type of issue occurs regularly in airports when a traveler is unaware of their privacy rights when it comes to unreasonable searches or alternative search methods available.

=== Texas and the Tenth Amendment ===
Following the implementation of enhanced pat downs in airports, the state of Texas challenged federal power by passing two bills into state legislature that would criminalize TSA officials from conducting these pat downs on travelers. Texas argued that the Tenth Amendment, which reserves all remaining power, not delegated to the federal government, to the state and people, allowed them to ensure police powers to protect citizens within their state. However, in 2011, U.S Department of Justice Murphy used the Supremacy Clause to argue that airport security is part of federal domain and cannot be controlled or changed by states laws.

== See also ==
- Airport Security
- September 11 Attacks
- Epassport
- Biometrics
- Full Body Scanner
- Automated Border Control System
- Detection Dog
- Homeland Security
