= Paul Ekman =

American psychologist (1934–2025)

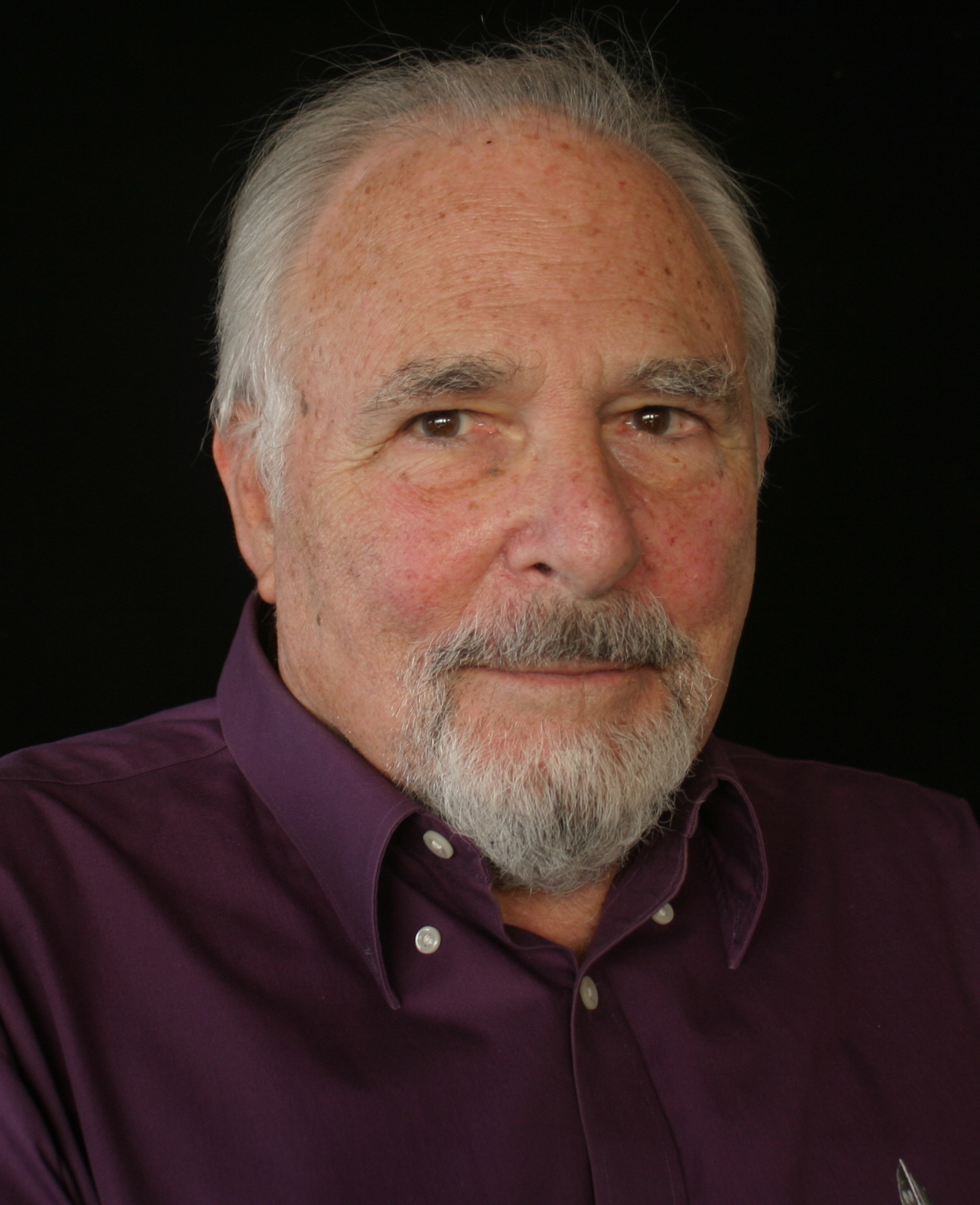
- Ekman in 2013
- Born: February 15, 1934; Washington, D.C., U.S.
- Died: November 17, 2025 (aged 91); San Francisco, California, U.S.
- Education: University of Chicago; New York University (BA); Adelphi University (MA, PhD)
- Known for: Microexpressions, Lie to Me
- Spouse: Mary Ann Mason
- Scientific career
- Fields: Psychology, anthropology
- Workplaces: San Francisco State University; UCSF
- Thesis: Nonverbal and verbal behavior as reinforcing stimuli of opinion responses (1958)
- Doctoral advisor: John Amsden Starkweather
- Website: PaulEkman.com

Paul Ekman (February 15, 1934 – November 17, 2025) was an American psychologist and professor at the University of California, San Francisco, who was a pioneer in the study of emotions and their relation to facial expressions. He was ranked 59th out of the 100 most eminent psychologists of the twentieth century in 2002 by the Review of General Psychology.

His empirical and theoretical work helped to restart the study of emotion and non-verbal communication in the field of psychology, and introduced new quantitative frameworks which researchers could use to do so. He also carried out important early work on the physiology of emotions.

== Early life ==
=== Childhood ===
Ekman was born in 1934 in Washington, D.C., and grew up in a Jewish family in New Jersey, aside from a brief spell in California during World War II. His father was a pediatrician and his mother was an attorney. His sister, Joyce Steingart, was a psychoanalytic psychologist who practiced in New York City.

Ekman originally wanted to be a psychotherapist, but when he was drafted into the U.S. Army in 1958 he found that research could change army routines, making them more humane. This experience converted him from wanting to be a psychotherapist to wanting to be a researcher, in order to help as many people as possible.

=== Education ===
At age 15, without graduating from high school, Ekman enrolled at the University of Chicago, where he completed three years of undergraduate study. During his time in Chicago, he was fascinated by group therapy sessions and understanding group dynamics. His classmates at Chicago included writer Susan Sontag, film director Mike Nichols, and actress Elaine May.

He then studied for two years at New York University (NYU), earning his BA in 1954. The subject of his first research project, under the direction of professor Margaret Tresselt, was an attempt to develop a test of how people would respond to group therapy.

Ekman was accepted into the Adelphi University graduate program for clinical psychology. While working for his master's degree, Ekman was awarded a predoctoral research fellowship from the National Institute of Mental Health (NIMH) in 1955. His master's thesis was focused on facial expression and body movement that he had begun to study in 1954. Ekman received his Ph.D. in clinical psychology at Adelphi University in 1958, after a one-year internship at the Langley Porter Neuropsychiatric Institute.

=== Military service ===
Ekman was drafted into the U.S. Army in 1958 to serve two years after his internship at Langley Porter was finished. He served as first lieutenant-chief psychologist, at Fort Dix, New Jersey, where he did research on army stockades and psychological changes during infantry basic training.

== Career ==
Upon completion of military service in 1960, he accepted a position as a research associate with Leonard Krasner at the Palo Alto Veterans Administration Hospital, working on a grant focused on the operant conditioning of verbal behavior in psychiatric patients. Ekman also met anthropologist Gregory Bateson in 1960 who was on the staff of the Palo Alto Veterans Administration Hospital. Five years later, Bateson gave Ekman motion picture films taken in Bali in the mid-1930s to help Ekman with cross-cultural studies of expression and gesture.

From 1960 to 1963, Ekman was supported by a post-doctoral fellowship from NIMH. He submitted his first research grant through San Francisco State College with himself as the principal investigator (PI) at the age of 29. He received this grant from NIMH in 1963 to study nonverbal behavior. This award was continuously renewed for the next 40 years and paid his salary until he was offered a professorship at the University of California, San Francisco (UCSF) in 1972.

Encouraged by his college friend and teacher Silvan S. Tomkins, Ekman shifted his focus from body movement to facial expressions. He wrote his most famous book, Telling Lies, publishing it in 1985. He retired in 2004 as professor of psychology in the Department of Psychiatry at UCSF. From 1960 to 2004, he also worked at the Langley Porter Psychiatric Institute on a limited basis consulting on clinical cases.

After retiring from the University of California, San Francisco, Ekman founded the Paul Ekman Group (PEG) and Paul Ekman International.

=== Media ===
In 2001, Ekman collaborated with John Cleese for the BBC documentary series The Human Face.

His work is frequently referred to in the TV series Lie to Me in which the character Dr. Lightman is based on Paul Ekman. Ekman served as a scientific adviser for the series.

He collaborated with Pixar's film director and animator Pete Docter as a scientific consultant for the latter's 2015 film Inside Out. Ekman also wrote a parent's guide to using Inside Out to talk with their children about emotion.

=== Influence ===
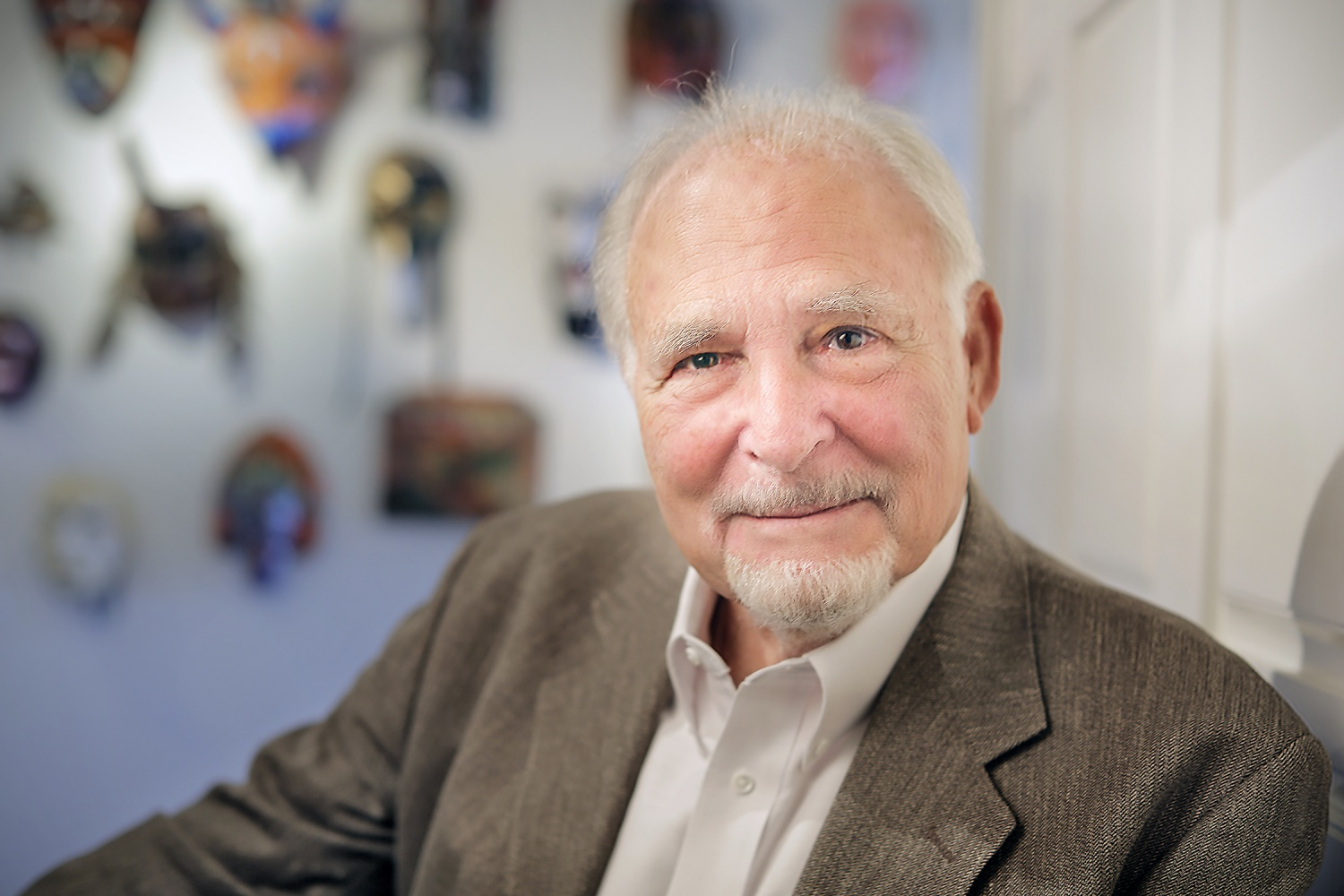
Ekman in 2016

Ekman was named one of the top Time 100 most influential people in the May 11, 2009, edition of Time magazine. He was also ranked 15th among the most influential psychologists of the 21st century in 2014 by the journal Archives of Scientific Psychology. He was on the editorial board of Greater Good magazine, published by the Greater Good Science Center of the University of California, Berkeley. Ekman's contributions included the interpretation of scientific research into the roots of compassion, altruism, and peaceful human relationships.

== Death ==
Ekman died at his home in San Francisco, California, on November 17, 2025, at the age of 91.

== Research work ==
=== Measuring nonverbal communication ===
Ekman's interest in nonverbal communication led to his first publication in 1957, describing how difficult it was to develop ways of empirically measuring nonverbal behaviour. He chose the Langley Porter Neuropsychiatric Institute, the psychiatry department of the University of California Medical School, for his clinical internship partly because Jurgen Ruesch and Weldon Kees had recently published a book called Nonverbal Communication (1956).

Ekman then focused on developing techniques for measuring nonverbal communication. He found that facial muscular movements that created facial expressions could be reliably identified through empirical research. He also found that human beings are capable of making over 10,000 facial expressions; only 3,000 relevant to emotion. Psychologist Silvan Tomkins convinced Ekman to extend his studies of nonverbal communication from body movement to the face, helping him design his classic cross-cultural emotion recognition studies.

=== Emotions as universal categories ===
In The Expression of the Emotions in Man and Animals published in 1872, Charles Darwin theorized that emotions were evolved traits universal to the human species. However, the prevalent belief during the 1950s, particularly among anthropologists, was that facial expressions and their meanings were determined through behavioral learning processes. A prominent advocate of the latter perspective was anthropologist Margaret Mead, who had traveled to different countries examining how cultures communicated using nonverbal behavior.

Through a series of studies, Ekman found a high agreement across members of diverse Western and Eastern literate cultures on selecting emotional labels that fit facial expressions. Expressions he found to be universal included those indicating wrath, grossness, fear, joy, loneliness, and shock. Findings on contempt were less clear, though there is at least some preliminary evidence that this emotion and its expression are universally recognized. Working with Wallace V. Friesen, Ekman demonstrated that the findings extended to preliterate Fore tribesmen in Papua New Guinea, whose members could not have learned the meaning of expressions from exposure to media depictions of emotion. Ekman and Friesen then demonstrated that certain emotions were exhibited with very specific display rules, culture-specific prescriptions about who can show which emotions to whom and when. These display rules could explain how cultural differences may conceal the universal effect of expression.

In the 1990s, Ekman proposed an expanded list of basic emotions, including a range of positive and negative emotions that are not all encoded in facial muscles. The newly included emotions are: amusement, contempt, contentment, embarrassment, excitement, guilt, pride in achievement, relief, satisfaction, sensory pleasure, and shame.

=== Visual depictions of facial actions for studying emotion ===
Ekman's well-known test of emotion recognition was the Pictures of Facial Affect (POFA) stimulus set published in 1976. Consisting of 110 black and white images of Caucasian actors portraying the six universal emotions plus neutral expressions, the POFA has been used to study emotion recognition rates in normal and psychiatric populations around the world. Ekman used these stimuli in his original cross-cultural research. Many researchers favor the POFA because these photographs have been rated by large normative groups in different cultures. In response to critics, however, Ekman eventually released a more culturally diverse set of stimuli called the Japanese and Caucasian Facial Expressions of Emotion (JACFEE).

By 1978, Ekman and Friesen had finalized and developed the Facial Action Coding System. FACS is an anatomically-based system for describing all observable facial movement for every emotion. Each observable component of facial movement is called an action unit or AU and all facial expressions can be decomposed into their constituent core AUs. The tool was updated in the early 2000s.

Other tools have been developed, including the MicroExpressions Training Tool (METT), which can help individuals identify more subtle emotional expressions that occur when people try to suppress their emotions. Application of this tool includes helping people with Asperger's or autism to recognize emotional expressions in their everyday interactions. The Subtle Expression Training Tool (SETT) teaches recognition of very small, micro signs of emotion. These are very tiny expressions, sometimes registering in only part of the face, or when the expression is shown across the entire face, but is very small. Subtle expressions occur for many reasons, for example, the emotion experienced may be very slight or the emotion may be just beginning.

Paul Ekman International was established in 2010 by the EIA Group based on a partnership between Cliff Lansley and Paul Ekman to deliver emotional skills and deception detection workshops around the world.

=== Detecting deception ===
Ekman has contributed to the study of social aspects of lying, why people lie, and why people are often unconcerned with detecting lies. He first became interested in detecting lies while completing his clinical work. As detailed in Ekman's Telling Lies, a patient he was involved in treating denied that she was suicidal in order to leave the hospital. Ekman began to review videotaped interviews to study people's facial expressions while lying. In a research project along with Maureen O'Sullivan, called the Wizards Project (previously named the Diogenes Project), Ekman reported on facial "microexpressions" which could be used to assist in lie detection. After testing 20,000 subjects from all walks of life, he found only 50 people who had the ability to spot deception without any formal training. These naturals are also known as "Truth Wizards", or wizards of deception detection from demeanor.

In his profession, he also used oral signs of lying. When interviewed about the Clinton–Lewinsky scandal, he mentioned that he could detect that President Bill Clinton was lying because he used distancing language.

== Contributions ==
In his 1993 paper in the psychology journal American Psychologist, Ekman describes nine direct contributions that his research on facial expression has made to the understanding of emotion. Highlights include:

- Consideration of both nature and nurture: Emotion is now viewed as a physiological phenomenon influenced by our cultural and learning experiences.
- Emotion-specific physiology: Ekman led the way in trying to find discrete psychophysiological differences across emotions. A number of researchers continue to search for emotion-specific autonomic and central nervous system activations. With the advent of neuroimaging techniques, interest revolves around how specific emotions relate to physiological activations in certain brain areas. Ekman laid the groundwork for the future field of affective neuroscience.
- An examination of events that precede emotions: Ekman's finding that voluntarily making one of the universal facial expressions can generate the physiology and some of the subjective experience of emotion provided some difficulty for some of the earlier theoretical conceptualizations of experiencing emotions.
- Considering emotions as families: Ekman & Friesen (1978) found not one expression for each emotion, but a variety of related but visually different expressions. For example, the authors reported 60 variations of the anger expression which share core configurational properties and distinguish themselves clearly from the families of fearful expressions, disgust expressions, and so on. Variations within a family likely reflect the intensity of the emotion, how the emotion is controlled, whether it is simulated or spontaneous, and the specifics of the event that provoked the emotion.

== Criticism ==
Most credibility-assessment researchers agree that untrained people are unable to visually detect lies. The application of part of Ekman's work to airport security via the Transportation Security Administration's "Screening Passengers by Observation Techniques" (SPOT) program has been criticized for not having been put through controlled scientific tests. A 2007 report on SPOT referring to untrained people stated that "simply put, people (including professional lie-catchers with extensive experience of assessing veracity) would achieve similar hit rates if they flipped a coin". Since controlled scientific tests typically involve people playing the part of terrorists, Ekman says those people are unlikely to have the same emotions as actual terrorists.

The methodology used by Ekman and O'Sullivan in their recent work on "Truth Wizards" has also received criticism on the basis of validation.

Other criticisms of Ekman's work are based on experimental and naturalistic studies by several other psychologists of emotion that did not find evidence in support of Ekman's proposed taxonomy of discrete emotions and discrete facial expression.

Methodological criticisms of Ekman's work focus on the essentially circular and tautological nature of his experiments, in which test subjects were shown selected photographs of "basic emotions", and then asked to match them with the same set of concepts used in their production. Ekman showed photographs selected from over 3000 pictures of individuals asked to simulate emotions, from which he edited to contain "those which showed only the pure display of a single affect," using no control and subject only to Ekman's intuition. If Ekman felt a photograph did not show the correct "pure" emotion, he excluded it.

Ekman received hostility from some anthropologists at meetings of the American Psychological Association and the American Anthropological Association from 1967 to 1969. He recounted that, as he was reporting his findings on universality of expression, one anthropologist tried to stop him from finishing by shouting that his ideas were fascist. He recounted another incident when he was accused of being racist by an activist for claiming that Black expressions are not different from White expressions. In 1975, Margaret Mead, an anthropologist, criticized Ekman for doing "improper anthropology", and for disagreeing with Ray Birdwhistell's claim opposing universality. Ekman wrote that, while many people agreed with Birdwhistell then, most came to accept his own findings over the next decade. Some anthropologists continued to suggest that emotions are not universal. Ekman argued that there has been no quantitative data to support the claim that emotions are culture specific. In his 1993 discussion of the topic, Ekman stated that there is no instance in which 70% or more of one cultural group select one of the six universal emotions while another culture group labels the same expression as another universal emotion.

Ekman criticized the tendency of psychologists to base their conclusions on surveys of college students. Hank Campbell quotes Ekman saying at the Being Human conference, "We basically have a science of undergraduates."

Ekman has refused to submit his more recent work to peer-review, claiming that revealing the details of his work might reveal state secrets and endanger security. Critics assert that this is instead an attempt to shield his work from methodological criticisms within experimental psychology, even as his public and popular visibility has grown.

== Publications ==
- 1972: Emotion in the Human Face ISBN 0-08-016643-1
- 1973: Darwin and Facial Expression: A Century of Research in Review ISBN 978-1883536886
- 1975: Unmasking the Face: A Guide to Recognizing Emotions from Facial Clues (with Wallace V. Friesen) ISBN 978-1-883536-36-7
- 1982: Handbook of Methods in Nonverbal Behavior Research (1982, edited with Klaus R. Scherer) ISBN 978-0521236140
- 1985: Telling Lies: Clues to Deceit in the Marketplace, Politics, and Marriage ISBN 978-0-393-30872-3
- 1989: Why Kids Lie: How Parents Can Encourage Truthfulness (with Mary Ann Mason) ISBN 978-0-14-014322-5
- 1994: The Nature of Emotion: Fundamental Questions (with R. Davidson, Oxford University Press, 1994) ISBN 0-19-508944-8
- 1997: What the Face Reveals: Basic and Applied Studies of Spontaneous Expression Using the Facial Action Coding System (FACS) (edited with Erika L. Rosenberg) ISBN 978-0-19-510446-2
- 1998: What the Face Reveals (with Rosenberg, E. L., Oxford University Press) ISBN 0-19-510446-3
- 1999: Handbook of Cognition and Emotion (Sussex, UK John Wiley & Sons, Ltd.)ISBN 978-0471978367
- 2002: A Practical Guide to FACS (with Wallace V. Friesen and Joseph C. Hager)
- 2002: Facial Action Coding System (FACS) (with Wallace V. Friesen and Joseph C. Hager) ISBN 978-0931835018
- 2003: Emotions Revealed: Recognizing Faces and Feelings to Improve Communication and Emotional Life ISBN 978-0-8050-8339-2
- 2008: Emotional Awareness: Overcoming the Obstacles to Psychological Balance and Compassion (with the Dalai Lama) ISBN 978-0-8050-9023-9
- 2016: Nonverbal Messages: Cracking the Code (with Wallace V. Friesen and Joseph C. Hager) ISBN 978-0991563630

== See also ==
- Affective neuroscience
- Animal communication
- Body language
- Discrete emotion theory § Criticism
- Emotional granularity
- Emotions and culture
- Emotion classification
- Origin of language
- Origin of speech
- Theory of constructed emotion

=== Other emotion researchers ===
- Lisa Feldman Barrett
- Marc Brackett
- Daniel Cordaro
