= Breaktime =

Breaktime may refer to:

- Breaktime (organization), a non-profit organization based in Boston, Massachusetts
- Breaktime (novel), a young adult novel by Aidan Chambers
