= Wizards Project =

The Wizards Project was a research project at the University of California, San Francisco led by Paul Ekman and Maureen O'Sullivan that studied the ability of people to detect lies. The experts identified in their study were called "Truth Wizards". O'Sullivan spent more than 20 years studying the science of lying and deceit. The project was originally named the Diogenes Project, after Diogenes of Sinope, the Greek philosopher who would look into people's faces using a lamp, claiming to be looking for an honest man.

== Synopsis ==
The project defined a "Truth Wizard" as a person identified who can identify deception with accuracy of at least 80%, whereas the average person rates around 50%. No Truth Wizard was 100% accurate. "Wizard" is used to mean "a person of amazing skill or accomplishment."

O'Sullivan and Ekman identified only 50 people as Truth Wizards after testing 20,000 (~0.25%) from all walks of life, including the Secret Service, FBI, sheriffs, police, attorneys, arbitrators, psychologists, students, and many others. Surprisingly, while psychiatrists and law enforcement personnel showed no more aptitude than college freshmen, Secret Service agents were the most skilled.

O'Sullivan remarked, "Our wizards are extraordinarily attuned to detecting the nuances of facial expressions, body language and ways of talking and thinking. Some of them can observe a videotape for a few seconds and amazingly they can describe eight details about the person on the tape."

Scientists are currently studying Truth Wizards to identify new ways to spot a liar.

Truth Wizards were reported to use multiple cues when assessing deception rather than relying on a single indicator. Research associated with the project suggested that they paid attention to microexpressions as well as inconsistencies in emotion, body language, and speech.

Ekman said on NPR: "We're still trying to find out how in the world did they learn this skill? Are they the sort of Mozarts of lie detection; they just had it?"

Ekman points out that the success rate of Truth Wizards is "without any specialized training," and claims that anyone can be trained to detect microexpressions, one element used by Truth Wizards to spot deception in some case, and has released a training CD to do that.

== Controversies ==
Psychologists Charles F. Bond and Ahmet Uysal of Texas Christian University criticized the methodology used by Ekman and O'Sullivan and suspected the performance of the reported Truth Wizards to be due to chance (a type I error), concluding that "convincing evidence of lie detection wizardry has never been presented." Gary D. Bond from Winston Salem State University later replicated the experiment using a more rigorous protocol and found two people to be exceptionally fast and accurate at lie detection out of 112 law enforcement officers and 122 undergraduate students, a result consistent with Ekman and O'Sullivan's. Both experts at lie detection were female Native American BIA correctional officers.

O'Sullivan responded to Bond and Uysal in "Unicorns or Tiger Woods: are lie detection experts myths or rarities? A response to on lie detection 'wizards' by Bond and Uysal". Bond and Uysal had critiqued a chapter which discussed the initial stages for a research program under way. They commented on two different issues in particular. Firstly, the scores of any "Truth Wizard" may have been a coincidence and secondly, the procedures used for testing does not meet the standards of classical psychometric class theory. Ekman, Mark Frank and O'Sullivan also published "Reply scoring and reporting: A response to Bond (2008)".

In addition, the methods employed by the original researchers have also come under criticism, with suggestion that methodological techniques and particular results have not been published fully.

== In popular culture ==
Ekman's work is the inspiration for the Fox TV series Lie to Me (2009–2011). One of the show's main characters, Ria Torres, is a "natural", that is, a Truth Wizard.
