= Daniel Cordaro =

American psychologist

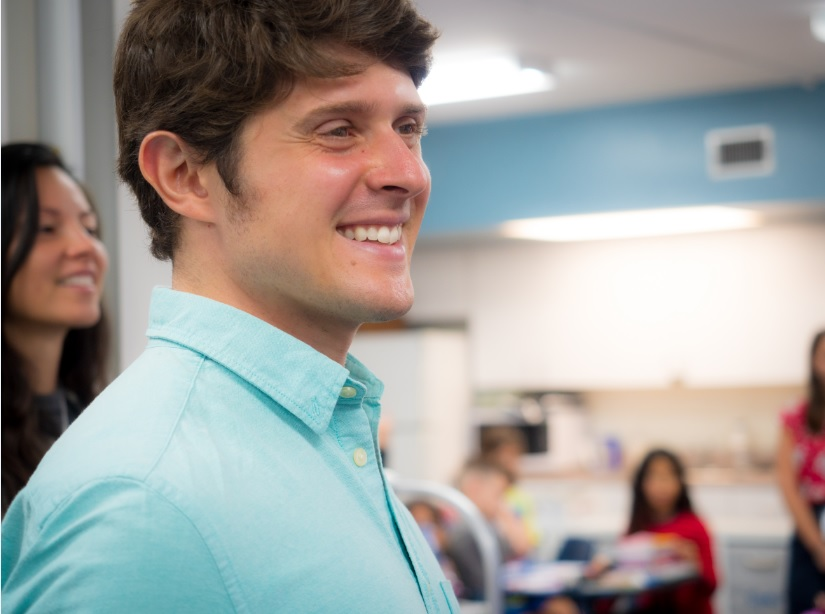
- Daniel Cordaro
- Other name: Daniel T. Cordaro
- Education: University of California, Berkeley (Chemistry, M.S.; Psychology, Ph.D.)
- Scientific career
- Fields: Psychology, Chemistry
- Workplaces: Contentment Foundation (2017-present); Yale University (2014-2017); UC Berkeley (2009-2014)
- Doctoral advisor: Dacher Keltner; Marc Brackett (postdoctoral advisor)
- Other academic advisors: Paul Ekman
- Website: Official website

Daniel Cordaro is an American research scientist and psychologist who specializes in emotion psychology and human wellbeing. As a former faculty member at Yale University, Cordaro is best known for his research in human emotion and positive psychology. Formerly the director of the Universal Expression Project at the University of California, Berkeley, Cordaro has conducted various worldwide studies on human emotional expression.

Cordaro directed the Universal Expression Project at the University of California, Berkeley, as well as the Contentment Lab at Yale University. Currently, he is the director of the Contentment Foundation, a non-profit organization that he had formed with Emilio Diez Barroso from the Contentment Lab at Yale University.

== Education ==
Cordaro grew up in Scranton, Pennsylvania. He received his M.A. and Ph.D. in psychology from the University of California, Berkeley. He also earned an M.S. in organic chemistry from UC Berkeley. After graduating from UC Berkeley, Cordaro completed his postdoctoral work at Yale University in 2014. Since 2009, Cordaro has studied human emotions and human well-being across several cultures.

== Career ==
In 2009, Cordaro directed the Universal Expression Project at the University of California, Berkeley. His team completed some of the largest international emotional expression studies and began to decode a universal language of human emotion. It extended the list of universal emotions and provided evidence for amusement, awe, contentment, desire, embarrassment, pain, relief, and sympathy in both facial and vocal expressions. The project has covered over 10 countries around the world, including Bhutan.

In 2015, he became a faculty member at Yale University and the Director of Wellbeing at the Yale Center for Emotional Intelligence, where he led the Contentment Lab and published some of the first original research on contentment. Cordaro co-founded Good Group with Justin Milano in 2015. In 2016, along with Emilio Diez Barroso, he co-founded the Contentment Foundation, a non-profit organization that provides wellbeing assessments, curricula, and practices for children and adults in schools internationally.

The Contentment Foundation is based on "The Four Pillars of Wellbeing," with the pillars being mindfulness, community, self-curiosity, and contentment. The Contentment Foundation's main service is to bring positive psychology and wellness practices to schools and organizations. In January 2020, the foundation expanded its offerings to include a new “Family Platform” that allows families to practice wellbeing at home. Cordaro's research reveals that across many cultures and traditions, contentment is the most prized emotion above all others, including happiness. Cordaro's philosophy for cultivating contentment includes practicing mindfulness, compassion and unconditionally accepting all emotions.

== Publications ==
- Cordaro, D., Sun, R., Kamble, S., Hodder, N., Monroy, M., Cowen, A., Bai, Y., and Keltner, D. (2019). The Recognition of 18 Facial-Bodily Expressions Across Nine Cultures. Emotion. In Press.
- Cordaro, Daniel T.; Bradley, Christina; Zhu, Franklyn; Vildostegui, Marla (September 2018). "Supporting improvements in classroom climate for students and teachers with the four pillars of wellbeing curriculum". Translational Issues in Psychological Science. 4 (3): 245–264. doi:10.1037/tps0000162. S2CID 158108873.
- Keltner, D., Cordaro, D., MacNeil, G., Simon-Thomas, E., Piff, P., and Jones, M. (2018). Darwin’s Emoticons: The Artistic Portrayal of 51 Emotions.
- Keltner, D., & Cordaro, D. T. (2017). Understanding multimodal emotional expressions: Recent advances in basic emotion theory. In J.-M. Fernández-Dols & J. A. Russell (Eds.), Oxford series in social cognition and social neuroscience. The science of facial expression (pp. 57–75). New York, NY, US: Oxford University Press.
- Keltner, D., Tracy, J., Sauter, D., Cordaro, D., McNeil, G. Expression of Emotion(2016). In Barrett, L.F., Lewis, M., Haviland-Jones, J.M. (Eds.). Handbook of Emotions. pp. 467–482. Guilford Press.
- Cordaro, Daniel T.; Keltner, Dacher; Tshering, Sumjay; Wangchuk, Dorji; Flynn, Lisa M. (2016). "The voice conveys emotion in ten globalized cultures and one remote village in Bhutan". Emotion. 16 (1): 117–128. doi:10.1037/emo0000100. ISSN 1931-1516. PMID 26389648. S2CID 3956684.
- Cordaro, Daniel T.; Keltner, Dacher (2017-04-24). Understanding Multimodal Emotional Expressions: Recent Advances in Basic Emotion Theory. Oxford University Press. doi:10.1093/acprof:oso/9780190613501.001.0001. ISBN 9780190613525.
- Cordaro, D. T., Brackett, M., Glass, L., & Anderson, C. L. (2016). Contentment: Perceived completeness across cultures and traditions. Review of General Psychology, 20(3), 221.
- Keltner, D. & Cordaro, D. (2015). Understanding Multimodal Emotional Expressions: Recent Advances in Basic Emotion Theory. Emotion Researcher.
- Baker, L.H., Cordaro, D., Platt, F.W. (2012). The First Minute. Medical Encounter. 26(4), 83-84.
- Ekman, P. & Cordaro, D. (2011). What is meant by calling emotions basic. Emotion Review. 3(4), 364-370.

=== Articles and chapters ===
Cordaro is also the author of several articles, such as the following.

- Cordaro, Daniel (May 27, 2020). "What If You Pursued Contentment Rather Than Happiness?". Greater Good Magazine.
- Cordaro, Daniel (May 29, 2020). "Struggling to find happiness while you're stuck at home? Experts say contentment is enough". Washington Post.

His research is also discussed in Chapter 4 ("Communication of Emotions") of the following book.

- Keltner, Dacher; Oatley, Keith; Jenkins, Jennifer M. (2018). Understanding Emotions. ISBN 9781119492542.

== See also ==
- Dacher Keltner
- Paul Ekman
- Marc Brackett
