= Langley Porter Psychiatric Hospital =

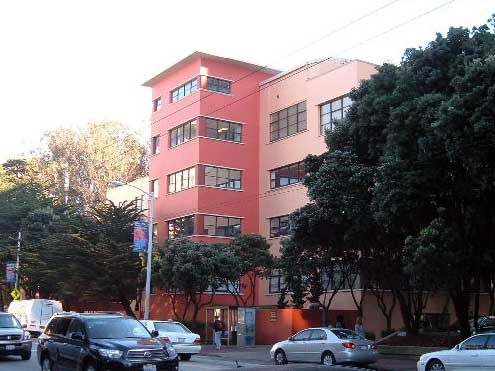
- The former location of the Langley Porter Psychiatric Institute on Parnassus Avenue

Geography
- Location: San Francisco, California, United States
- Coordinates: 37°47′6″N 122°26′21″W

Organization
- Type: Teaching
- Affiliated university: University of California, San Francisco

Services
- Beds: 30
- Speciality: Psychiatry

History
- Former names: Langley Porter Clinic, Langley Porter Psychiatric Institute
- Opened: 1942

Links
- Website: psych.ucsf.edu/lpph
- Lists: Hospitals in California

Langley Porter Psychiatric Hospital (LPPH) is a psychiatric teaching hospital, part of the Psychiatry Department at the University of California, San Francisco. It was located on the Parnassus campus of UCSF until 2023, when it moved to the UCSF Medical Center at Mount Zion.

Langley Porter Clinic was the first psychiatric institute in California, and is the oldest facility of the UCSF Psychiatry Department.

== History ==
The foundation stone of the hospital was laid in 1941. The hospital opened in 1942 with 100 beds, and was completed in 1943. The hospital was first known by the name "Langley Porter Clinic", which later changed to the "Langley Porter Neuropsychiatric Institute", and later again to "Langley Porter Psychiatric Institute", or informally, "LPPI". In 1948, "the clinic's director, Karl Bowman, was transforming it into one of the world's most important hubs for research into transgender sexual identities." It was also "an important early center for the development of psychedelic therapy."

The LPPI became part of the medical center's accreditation in 1962. It was named after Dr. Robert Langley Porter, a prominent and influential dean of UCSF.

The eminent psychologist Paul Ekman worked here from 1960 to 2004. Anthropologist Gregory Bateson, a former OSS officer; and poet Weldon Kees also worked here in the 1950s with psychiatrist Jurgen Ruesch. During WWII, Virginia Prince, a trans woman and pharmacologist who became "an early transgender activist" also worked at the clinic.

Langley Porter Psychiatric Hospital relocated to a renovated space on the seventh floor of the UCSF Mount Zion Medical Center in 2023. The former LPPI building at UCSF's Parnassus campus (dating to 1942) was then demolished to make way for a new 15-story, 324-bed hospital for the UCSF Medical Center, which is estimated to cost $4.3 billion and open in 2030.

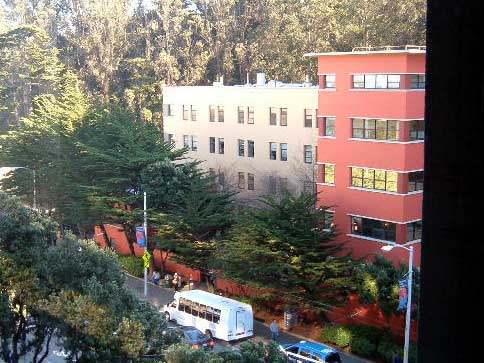
The former location of LPPI on Parnassus Avenue, seen from the UCSF Ambulatory Care Center

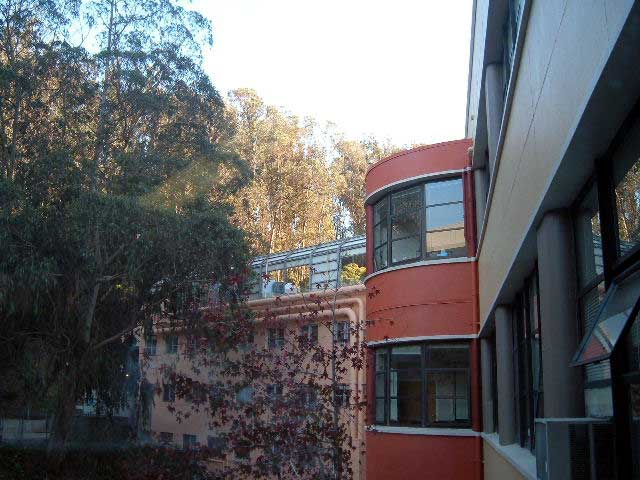
Rear view of the former location of LPPI on Parnassus Hill
