= Born This Way Foundation =

American non-profit organization

Born This Way Foundation!
- Founded: 2011; 15 years ago
- Founders: Lady Gaga; Cynthia Germanotta
- Type: NGO
- Location: Massachusetts, U.S.
- Revenue: $903,263 (2015)
- Expenses: $757,950 (2015)
- Website: bornthisway.foundation

Born This Way Foundation (sometimes abbreviated as BTWF) is a non-profit organization founded in late 2011 and launched on February 29, 2012 by American singer and activist Lady Gaga and her mother, Cynthia Germanotta. Named after the singer's 2011 album Born This Way, and the song from the album with the same name, the foundation is committed to supporting the wellness of young people and working with them to "make the world kinder and braver".

The foundation prioritizes the mental health and wellness of young people by working to promote kindness and open and honest conversations about mental health, validating the emotions of young people, and eradicating the stigma around mental health.

Furthermore, the foundation works to "connect, engage, and inspire young people — on the road, in their communities, and online". The foundation's programs focus on modeling healthy conversations about mental wellness, connecting youth with resources and services, and fostering communities that prioritize mental health.

== Background ==
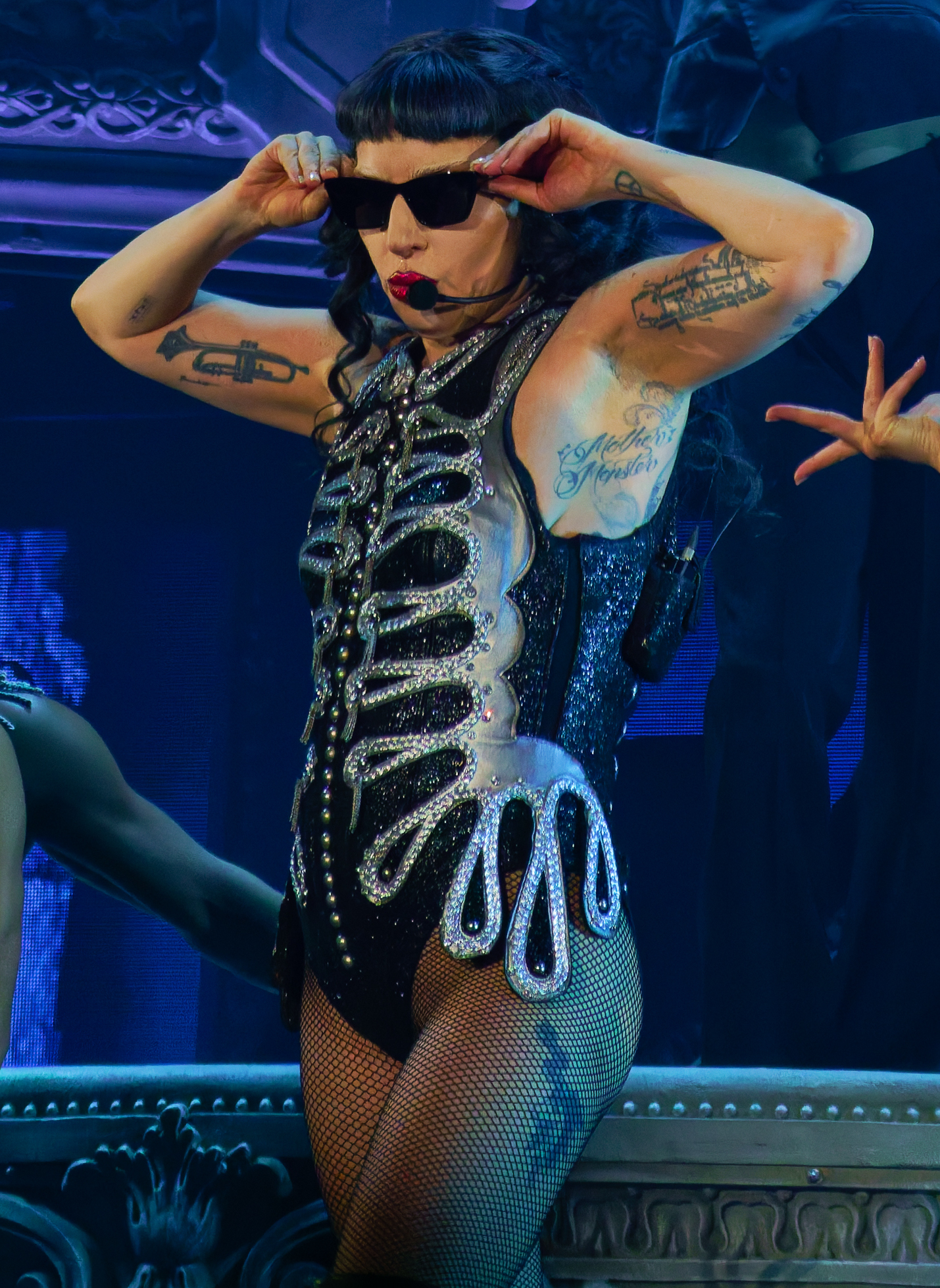
Lady Gaga performing "Born This Way", the namesake of the foundation, at a 2025 Melbourne concert

In the documentary "Inside the Outside", Lady Gaga described how she has been bullied herself during her adolescence, being thrown in a trash can while classmates looked on. The singer often shares her personal experiences with the public, and has always hoped to “establish a standard of Bravery and Kindness, as well as a community worldwide that protects and nurtures others in the face of bullying and abandonment."

In a PBS interview, Cynthia Germanotta stated that Lady Gaga was bullied at an early age and subsequently developed anxiety and depression, struggling with mental illness throughout college. As her career took off, she talked openly about her mental health challenges and the importance of kindness.

In 2016, Lady Gaga discussed the importance of kindness and compassion at the 84th Annual U.S. Conference of Mayors in Indianapolis. She joined the 14th Dalai Lama at the event to talk about building "compassionate cities" around the country. During her speech, Gaga told city representatives, "Kindness is a free currency from a well that will never dry up," and, "The most efficient way for you to act with young people is to be a calming force."

Cynthia Germanotta stated in a 2018 PBS interview that the foundation was established to support young people and promote a "kinder and braver world". Its activities focus on fostering kindness, creating supportive environments and promoting mental well-being among young people.

Executive Director Maya Enista Smith additionally stated that the foundation exists “to help eliminate the stigma surrounding mental health and equip young people to have those conversations that lead to that destigmatization.”

In October 2018, Lady Gaga was named as one of Elle's Women in Hollywood honorees. During her acceptance speech, she encouraged everyone to “work together to beckon the world towards kindness” and opened up about the PTSD she developed after she was assaulted at age 19. She additionally advocated for stronger mental health resources, stating she wanted to see mental health become a “global priority”.

Lady Gaga stated: “It is my personal dream that there would be a mental health expert teacher or therapist in every school in this nation and hopefully, one day, around the world. Let’s lift our voices. I know we are, but let’s get louder. And not just as women. But as humans.”

In November 2018, Lady Gaga accepted the SAG-AFTRA Foundation's Artists Inspiration Award, and in a 25-minute speech shared her own mental health struggles, advocated for stronger mental health resources in the industry by requesting SAG-AFTRA partner with the foundation, and encouraged people to share their mental health stories.

“When I speak about mental health, even or especially when I’m speaking about mine, it is often met with quietness, or maybe a somber line of fans waiting outside to whisper to me in the shadows about their darkest secrets,” she said in her acceptance speech. “We need to bring mental health into the light. We need to share our stories so that global mental health no longer resides and festers in the darkness.”

She additionally encouraged everyone to “live in a culture of kindness through our individual acts and take back what determines our future.”

== History ==
Lady Gaga's signature

The organization was launched on February 29, 2012, by artist Lady Gaga and her mother Cynthia Germanotta, who said, "challenge meanness and cruelty by inspiring young people to create a support system in their respective communities." Media proprietor Oprah Winfrey, writer Deepak Chopra, and United States Secretary of Health and Human Services Kathleen Sebelius spoke at the inauguration. The foundation's original funding included $1.2 million from Lady Gaga, $500,000 from the John D. and Catherine T. MacArthur Foundation, and $850,000 from retailer Barneys New York.

BTWF was the beneficiary of Barneys New York's 2011 holiday campaign which also featured "Lady Gaga’s Workshop". In May 2012, Viacom announced it would be the foundation's lead media partner for the development of events, programming and "opportunities that empower young people to build a braver, kinder world." In August 2012, Lady Gaga was named by American business magazine Forbes as fourteenth on their "World's 100 Most Powerful Women" list due in part to her BTWF work.

In 2018, Born This Way Foundation was the recipient of Girls Inc.’s Champion For Girls Award and the Children Mending Heart’s “Global Changemakers” Award. That same year, co-founder of the foundation Cynthia Germanotta was invited to speak at the United Nations General Assembly on behalf of the organization to discuss mental health and launch a new “United for Global Mental Health” initiative.

=== Controversy ===
In March 2014, gossip blogger Roger Friedman of Showbiz411, and formerly of Fox News, criticized the foundation's spending reflected in its federal tax reports. The reports noted spending of $348,000 on its Born Brave bus tour; approximately $1.5 million on fees related to web and social media, publicity, and legalities, and only $5,000 in grants to individuals and other organizations. "It’s unclear that anyone was really helped by the Born This Way foundation other than lawyers, consultants, publicists and travel agents," Friedman wrote.

"We do the work," Lady Gaga wrote in response. "We do not raise money and allocate the funds to other charities for them to do the work.” “A clear understanding of the differences between a grant-making organization and one that carries out its work directly would have made this a non-story," Cynthia Germanotta added in an op-ed in the Huffington Post "We are not a grant-maker that funds the work of other charities, and were never intended to be ... [But] we are having a profound impact in just a very short period of time.”

Charity Navigator in 2018 gave the charity a score of 75 out of 100, the same as its passing score for Finance and Accountability.

== Programming and campaigns ==
=== Dom Pérignon ===
Gaga collaborated with Champagne house Dom Pérignon to release a limited edition of bottles along with a sculpture designed by her. The campaign, released on April 6, 2021, was shot by Nick Knight and visualized by Nicola Formichetti, and is described as a "celebration of pushing the boundaries of creation, constant reinvention, and passionate dedication." The 110 exclusive pieces will be sold at private sales, and the profits will benefit the foundation.

=== Channel Kindness ===
On September 15, 2016, Born This Way Foundation launched a new program called Channel Kindness, which is designed “to give youth a voice in a media landscape that too often ignores or misrepresents young people.” In creating this program, Born This Way Foundation recognized the absence of positive stories in today's media. Channel Kindness is designed to fill that void and provide individuals across the globe with optimism and encouragement.

From 2017–2018, the program recruited and trained 100 youth reporters ages 15–24 from across the United States to recognize and broadcast acts of kindness they saw in their everyday lives and communities. Their stories are published on ChannelKindness.org and are spread across the program's social media channels.

In 2018, BTWF announced it would expand Channel Kindness, which is now open to anyone from across the U.S. and, for the first time, around the world to share their stories on the platform.

==== #MultiplyYourGood ====
In honor of World Kindness Day in 2018, Born This Way Foundation announced the launch of the #MultiplyYourGood Channel Kindness Challenge. With support from Zappos, the campaign called on individuals to celebrate their power to make a difference by volunteering or donating to a nonprofit in their community. For every act of good performed during the challenge, BTWF pledged to “multiply” it by performing an act of good for one of the organization's nonprofit partners.

The Foundation's diverse network of partners, including SoulCycle, which invited riders to take part, and Starbucks, which hosted community events on World Kindness Day 2018 in ten stores nationwide, helped amplify the campaign. The in-store activations invited guests to participate in an activity that met the needs of a local nonprofits, such as collecting donated items or writing holiday messages for homeless youth.

==== #Someone2Turn2 ====
Born This Way Foundation and United for Global Mental Health announced the launch of the #Someone2Turn2 Channel Kindness Challenge to foster healthy conversations about mental wellness in honor of World Mental Health Day on Wednesday, October 10, 2018. Inspired by the work of the Friendship Bench initiative, the #Someone2Turn2 challenged the public to have a real, honest, and open discussion about mental health with the person they turn to when they need support and then share who their #Someone2Turn2 is on social media.

=== #BeKind21 ===
#BeKind21 is an annual initiative that encourages people to do at least one kind activity a day for 21 days, starting on September 1 and extending to September 21. Inspired by the idea that it takes 21 days to build a habit, the campaign culminated in 2018 on the U.N. International Day of Peace and inspired over 8 million acts of kindness. As part of #BeKind21, participants could take a pledge to make kindness a habit, as the campaign stems from beliefs that kindness can heal the world and when someone gives to others, they give back to their own wellness. In its second year, Born This Way Foundation reported over 7,000 sign-ups and 1.6 million participants for the #BeKind21 campaign, partnering with over 130 organizations: schools, nonprofits, and corporations. Also in 2019, those who signed up for the campaign were encouraged to form “Kindness Teams” on which they could do kind acts as a group. The efforts of the 2019 #BeKind21 campaign resulted in over 40 million acts of kindness—up over 32 million from the year before—and it will kick off its third year on September 1, 2020.

=== #BeKindBeThere ===
#BeKindBeThere is a joint initiative between Born This Way Foundation and Jack.org to highlight Jack.org's program BeThere.org. BeThere.org aims to teach young people the skills necessary to support someone else's mental health while protecting their own. BeThere.org offers five steps, or “Golden Rules,” to support someone who is struggling with their mental health. These are: (1) say what you see by breaking the ice and starting a conversation, (2) show you care by building trust and supporting someone, (3) hear them out by being a good listener and balancing the conversation, (4) know your role by setting boundaries to protect your relationship and own mental health, and (5) connect to help by accessing professional and community resources. Promoted with video conversation between the two organizations and across all social media platforms with the hashtag #BeKindBeThere, these golden rules can be found in more detail on BeThere.org.

=== Teen Mental Health First Aid ===
In 2019, Born This Way Foundation partnered with the National Council for Behavioral Health to bring teen Mental Health First Aid (teenMHFA) training to the United States. teenMHFA is an in-person training designed for high school students in grades 10 to 12 “to learn about mental illnesses, including how to identify and respond to a developing mental health or substance use problem among their peers.” The program herein is built upon the idea that, during mental health crises, teens often first turn to each other for support and guidance, rather than to structural resources. Addressing this chain of dialogue, students learn a five-step action plan to help their friends who may be facing a mental health problem or crisis, such as suicide, and how to find and involve a responsible and trusted adult.

Starting with a pilot set of eight schools across the nation, the program expanded to an additional 20 primary institutions in the fall of 2019. In June 2019, Born This Way Foundation convened a group of teens trained through teenMHFA in Las Vegas to reflect on the program. During her June 6 show of her ENIGMA residency, Lady Gaga brought the students onstage to discuss the mental wellness program with attendees.

Starting in the spring of 2020, 40 additional schools were chosen to participate in the second round of Teen Mental Health First Aid training programs. This expansion brings the total number of schools participating to more than 75 schools nationwide.

=== Emotion Revolution Summit at Yale University ===
On October 24, 2015, Born This Way Foundation and the Yale Center for Emotional Intelligence hosted the Emotion Revolution Summit to raise awareness of how much emotions play into young people's decision-making and wellness. The event consisted of round-table discussions, workshops, and speeches from a variety of educators and advocates, including Lady Gaga herself. Lady Gaga asked the over 200 young people at the conference to focus on and care for their own mental and emotional health. She invited them to join a movement addressing the importance of emotions on social media using the hashtag #IAmNotJust.

Born This Way Foundation and the Yale Center for Emotional Intelligence also collected data from these students and found that when students were asked how they currently feel in school, 75% of the responses were negative.

=== "What does bravery mean to you?" Campaign ===
From March 28 to April 11, 2012, the Born This Way Foundation ran a poster campaign to inspire bravery and encouraged supporters to submit images that answer the question, "What does bravery mean to you?" with the 10 semi finalists selected by Lady Gaga and her mother, and leading to a prize for the winner(s), selected by fans.

== Community Activations ==
=== Kindness in Community Fund ===
In 2022, in coordination with Lady Gaga's The Chromatica Ball summer stadium tour, Born This Way Foundation awarded $1 million to 22 organizations that support youth mental health and wellness in cities that hosted her concerts. In Boston, Breaktime, a nonprofit that helps young adults experiencing homelessness, and BAGLY, a LGBTQ+ rights advocacy organization, each received $50,000 grants. The Kindness in Community Fund is a continuation of the philanthropy work from the Channel Kindness Tour.

=== The Channel Kindness Tour ===
From August 1, 2017, through December 18, 2017, Born This Way Foundation accompanied Lady Gaga on her Joanne World Tour, visiting over 30 cities across the US and Canada. The Channel Kindness Tour included in venues activations, which allowed local nonprofits to connect directly with concert goes; communities conversations on mental health and services events; and Channel Kindness Awards which recognized eight youth across the country.

=== Share Kindness ===
In 2016, the Foundation joined forces with Today and NBC with the goal to inspire 1 million acts of kindness before the end of the year. With the hashtag #ShareKindness, people were encouraged to celebrate empathy and generosity by committing an act of kindness for someone else in their schools, homes, businesses, and communities.

To help kick off #ShareKindness, Lady Gaga and her mother Cynthia Germanotta, visited the Ali Forney Center, a shelter for homeless LGBTQ+ youth in Harlem in New York City.

Lady Gaga surprised the youth with gifts, encouraging messages, and led a meditation session alongside her mother. She encouraged the group with her mantra, “You are brave. You are courageous,” and concluded with a strong statement of gratitude to each of the youth: “Thank you for being alive.”

Lady Gaga also emphasized the value of kindness: “Kindness to me is an action of love or a showing of love to someone else and I also believe that kindness is the cure to violence and hatred around the world."

=== Born Brave Bus ===
The Foundation announced in May 2012 that the Born Brave Bus would follow Lady Gaga on tour as an initiative to inspire bravery, empower the youth, and connect young people to resources in their community. In June 2012, "Born Brave" communities and school groups, dedicated to making a positive change where they live. Born Brave Nation, a name chosen by Born This Way Foundation supporters, requested founding members in July 2012, but the bus had not yet launched. The Foundation partnered with community organizations like Campus Pride, GLSEN, the National Association of School Psychologists and Youth Service America to connect young people to the resources in their communities.

== Partnerships ==
=== Starbucks/Cups of Kindness ===
In 2017, the Foundation and Starbucks teamed up to introduce the Starbucks Cups of Kindness collection: four special drinks, the Matcha Lemonade, Violet Drink, Pink Drink, and Ombré Pink Drink. For each cup of kindness beverage that was purchased between June 13 and June 19, Starbucks donated $0.25 to Born This Way Foundation and the Channel Kindness project.

On June 3, 2019, Starbucks announced it was partnering with Born This Way Foundation for Pride Month in order to fundraise for the Foundation and offer support to grassroots LGBTQ+ organizations across the United States. For the month of June, Starbucks Foundation matched any donations that were made to Born This Way Foundation up to $250,000.

=== United For Global Mental Health ===
In October 2018, the Foundation helped launch United for Global Mental Health at “Time to Act on Global Mental Health: Building Momentum on Mental Health in the SDG Era,” an event organized by United for Global Mental Health during the United National General Assembly. The Foundation's Co-Founder and President Cynthia Germanotta shared her personal story and helped moderate panels to help bring the topic of mental health at the forefront of the world stage.

=== DonorsChoose.org ===
Born This Way Foundation partners with DonorsChoose to fund mental health projects at schools across the country. The partnership has matched donations from 1,900 donors to fund these projects. Through this partnership, BTWF and DonorsChoose have funded 697 projects at 416 different schools. These projects have worked to help 75,981 students and 507 teachers. The projects range from an after-school kindness club to a drawing space for students, and much more.

=== The National Council on Behavioral Health - Mental Health First Aid ===
In August 2017, Born This Way Foundation partnered with the National Council for Behavioral Health to train 150,000 people in Mental Health First Aid. Training sessions were held along the stops for Lady Gaga's Joanne world tour, as part of BTWF's Channel Kindness Tour. Mental Health First Aid trains individuals to recognize and respond to people experiencing mental health or substance abuse crises.

Born This Way Foundation continues to work with Mental Health First Aid to encourage supporters to get trained in the program.

=== Staples ===
Staples and Born This Way Foundation collaborated on the Staples for Students Digital Kindness Tree to encourage people nationwide to promote kindness in schools and celebrate everyday acts of kindness. Consumers helped it grow by visiting StaplesKindnessTree.com or by Tweeting with hashtag #GrowKindness. On the website and Twitter, users had the opportunity to describe an act of kindness that they recently performed, witnessed or pledge to do. Each time an act of kindness was reported, a “leaf” was added to the tree, which continued to grow throughout the summer with each kind act reported.

=== Office Depot ===
In 2012, Lady Gaga expressed an interest in being part of the "natural fabric of schooling." In July 2012, BTWF partnered with the supplier of office products Office Depot to create a range of limited edition back-to-school products including: "empowerment gift cards" containing motivational messages, and "bravery bracelets." Office Depot agreed to donate 25% of the sale value for each item sold and guaranteed US$1 million donation in 2012 to the Foundation. This led the Florida Family Association, what New York Times noted was a “one-man Christian fundamentalist organization,” to accuse Office Depot of influencing teenagers to reject heterosexuality. In support of the efforts by Office Depot and Born This Way Foundation, public service announcement videos that highlighted the mission of the initiative were created by model and actor Patrick Schwarzenegger, and by pop singer Greyson Chance to be aired on Facebook, YouTube, and other outlets.

== Research ==
The Foundation has worked with various partners to conduct and amplify research focused on youth wellness and empowerment. Below is a list of research commissioned or supported by Born This Way Foundation.

=== 2019 ===
==== Youth Mental Health in America ====
In early 2019, the Foundation worked with the Benenson Strategy Group to survey more than 2,000 young people between the ages of 13 and 24 to explore how young people perceive mental health, their level of access to mental health resources, and what those resources look like.

Key findings of the survey revealed that young people care about their mental health but lack access to crucial resources to support themselves. Young people shared they are unaware of where to go and the cost associated with finding mental health resources. The data showed that youth are interested in using a variety of resources to support their mental health. The survey showed that young people need more education on existing mental health resources and expanded access to these resources.

=== 2018 ===
==== Mental Health Online Diaries: Understanding Child-Parent/Guardian Relationships ====
In early 2018, BTWF commissioned a study from the Benenson Strategy Group to conduct a series of online ethnographic diary interviews between 20 young people aged 13–24 and their parents/guardians to learn more about the family dynamics of mental health and wellness.

The questions allowed researchers to further understand what makes for supportive environments and relationships and the ways in which young people and their parents/guardians feel connected or disconnected to their families and broader support network. Findings from this Mental Health Online Diaries study revealed that counter to common narratives, young people see immense value in real life relationships, parents are making an effort to talk about mental health but sometimes do not connect, and hard conversations do not happen when young people fear being judged and parents do not initiate them.

==== Digital Communities: Youth Mental Health and Online Behavior ====
With data gathered during the Kind Communities survey, the Foundation explored questions related to youth mental health and their digital habits. In addition to examining the correlation between social media use and mental wellness, the Digital Communities: Youth Mental Health and Online Behavior survey sought to better understand how youth – including those who identify as LGBT+ – perceive their digital communities and how they use online resources to better understand and manage their mental health.

=== 2017 ===
==== Kind Communities – A Bridge To Youth Mental Wellness ====
In 2017, the Foundation commissioned the “Kind Communities – A Bridge To Youth Mental Wellness” survey from the Benenson Strategy Group. The survey collected data from over 3,000 young people between the ages of 15-24 and over 1,000 parents, asking questions about mental health and wellness. Some of the key findings from this comprehensive study include: Young people who describe their environments as kind are more likely to be mentally healthy, youth rely on a small set of close friends for support, and young people with access to tangible resources are more mentally healthy.

=== 2016 ===
==== Born Brave Experiences Research ====
The Born Brave Experiences Research is a series of studies focused on improving our understanding of the factors that influence youth empowerment, youth engagement, mental health, and emotional well-being. By working with partners across the country and surveying youth themselves, the research gained is used to learn how to better promote kindness and mental wellness in schools, communities, and homes. The surveys were conducted by Dr. Sue Swearer, the Willa Cather Professor of Educational Psychology at the University of Nebraska-Lincoln. Dr. Swearer has chaired Born This Way Foundation's Research Advisory Board and led the Born Brave Experience research with assistance from Raul Palacios, Ed.S, a Doctoral Student at the University of Nebraska-Lincoln.

=== 2015 ===
==== Emotion Revolution Survey ====
In 2015, the Foundation and the Yale Center for Emotional Intelligence partnered to launch the Emotion Revolution Survey. Collecting data from over 22,000 high school students, the survey found that when students were asked how they currently feel in school, 75% of the responses were negative. In fact, the most common responses were “tired,” “stressed,” and “bored.” However, when students were asked how they want to feel in school, the most frequently listed emotions were overwhelmingly positive, such as “happy,” “energized,” and “excited.”

== Additional projects ==
1. On October 16, 2016, toy company Mattel released the Zomby Gaga collector doll for pre-order as a part of their Monster High doll line in partnership with the BTWF. The doll is based on Gaga's Zombie Boy inspired skeleton tattoo makeup and tuxedo look from the Born This Way music video and designed by Gaga's sister Natali Germanotta together with Mattel. The doll was released on Jan 2, 2017, with all proceeds benefiting the Foundation.
2. White House National Conference on Mental Health - In 2013, BTWF became an official partner of President Barack Obama and Vice President Joe Biden's Empowerment Initiative to help create and continue “a national conversation to increase understanding and awareness about mental health.”
3. In September 2012, Gaga launched a new project called A Body Revolution 2013 to address poor body image and body acceptance. This was done, in part, because media outlets had negatively remarked on supposed weight gains by the performer. To start the project, she posted images of herself in underwear on LittleMonsters.com and asked others to follow her lead stating, "May we make our flaws famous, and thus redefine the heinous." She accompanied the photos with statements that she suffered from the eating disorders bulimia and anorexia nervosa since she was 15.
4. In August 2012, Born This Way Foundation Co-founder Cynthia Germanotta was one of the speakers at the U.S. Department of Education's third annual Federal Partners in Bullying Prevention Summit to coordinate "anti-bullying efforts with the best available research." She appeared with White House senior advisor Valerie Jarrett with their speeches broadcast on C-SPAN. Born This Way Foundation's work was discussed among other ongoing anti-bullying efforts.

== Awards and recognitions ==
Cynthia Germanotta, Lady Gaga, and Born This Way Foundation have been the recipient of numerous honors, including the National Council for Behavioral Health's Change Champion Award, the Family Online Safety Institute's award for Outstanding Achievement, the National Association of School Psychologists Special Friend to Children Award, the Anti-Defamation League's "No Place for Hate" Making a Difference Award, the Children Mending Hearts Global Changemakers Award, and the President's Medal of Excellence from the Teachers College, Columbia University. Logo also named the Foundation 2013's Most Innovative Charity at their annual NewNowNext Awards.

1. The New York Academy of Medicine – Bold & Brave Award for Cynthia Germanotta
2. The Brain & Behavior Research Foundation – 2019 Honorary Pardes Humanitarian Prize in Mental Health for Cynthia Germanotta and Born This Way Foundation
3. 2018 Erasing the Stigma Awards – Leadership Award for Born This Way Foundation
4. Children Mending Hearts award for Cynthia Germanotta and Born This Way Foundation
5. National Council for Behavioral Health's Change Champion Award
6. Anti-Defamation League's “No Place for Hate” award for Born This Way Foundation
7. NewNowNext Awards Most Innovative Charity for Born This Way Foundation
8. President's Medal of Excellence for Cynthia Germanotta
9. Family Online Safety Institute's award for Cynthia Germanotta
10. 2013 National Association of School Psychologists Special Friend of Children Award
11. Women Builder Council – Change Agent Award for Cynthia Germanotta

== Press articles ==
- When I Realized I Needed to Change the Way I Talk to My Daughters About Mental Health. The Mighty – August 2018
- Lady Gaga's Mom Cynthia Germanotta Addresses UN, Stresses the Importance of Mental Health Resources. Billboard – September 2018
- The Mental Health Lesson Lady Gaga's Mom Wishes She Learned Years Ago. Refinery 29 – October 6, 2017
- Long Island Middle Schoolers Participating In Born This Way Foundation's Kindness Challenge. CBS New York – September 20, 2018
- Lady Gaga's #BeKindBeTheDifference Campaign Brings Awareness To Mental Health In The Best Way. Elite Daily – May 1, 2018
- Cynthia Germanotta, Lady Gaga's Mom, Wants Mental Health First Aid To Be A Priority With The “Be Kind Be The Difference” Campaign. Bustle – May 12, 2018
- LGBTQ youth more likely to seek community online, survey shows. NBC News – January 2018
- Cynthia Germanotta On Ending Mental Health Stigma. MSNBC – October 11, 2018
- Dalai Lama, Lady Gaga Talk of Kindness at Mayors Conference. Associated Press – June 26, 2016
- The President of the Born This Way Foundation Urges Tech Executives to Sign a Pledge to End Online Harassment. Vox– June 1, 2016
- Lady Gaga Launches Foundation. Boston Globe – March 1, 2012

== See also ==
- Happy Hippie Foundation
- Clara Lionel Foundation
