= Robert Niemi =

American literary scholar, literary critic and author

Robert James "Bob" Niemi (April 17, 1955 – September 17, 2022) from Fitchburg, Massachusetts) was an American literary scholar, literary critic and author. From 1990 to 2022 he was professor of English at Saint Michael's College in Colchester.

== Life ==
Robert Niemi was born in 1955 in Fitchburg as one of three sons of Alfred A. Niemi and Anita Mary (Cormier) Niemi.

Niemi attended Fitchburg High School until 1973. In 1977 he graduated with a Bachelor of Arts in English at University of Massachusetts Amherst. In 1978 he received the MSLS at Columbia University. At the University of Massachusetts Amherst he graduated with a Master of Arts in English in 1988 and with his dissertation Music Out of an Abyss: A Critical Study of the Fiction of Weldon Kees he graduated with a Ph.D. in English in 1991.

Since 1990 Niemi taught American Studies, American literature and cultural history, film studies, critical theory and popular culture studies at the Saint Michael's College in Colchester, Vermont. In September 2012 the faculty awarded him the Scholarship and Artistic Achievement Award.

He has published several non-fiction books on literary, film and popular culture issues. Niemi has written books about Weldon Kees, Russell Banks, the Beat Generation, filmmaker Robert Altman as part of the Directors' Cuts series of Columbia University Press and the genre of the War film with his genre overview 100 Great War Movies: The Real History Behind the Film. He also published articles, book reviews and encyclopedic entries.

Niemi was married to Constance "Connie" Dufour and lived in Essex Junction, Vermont. He died September 17, 2022, aged 67.

== Selected works ==
- with Daniel Gillane: The Bibliography of Weldon Kees. Jackson, Mississippi, Parrish House, 1997.
- Russell Banks. New York, Twayne Publishers; London, Prentice Hall International, 1997, ISBN 978-0-80574-018-9.
- History in the Media: Film and Television. 1st edition, Santa Barbara, California, ABC-CLIO, 2006, ISBN 978-1-57607-953-9.
- The Ultimate, Illustrated Chronology of the Beats. (2011) Berkeley, California, Soft Skull Press, 2011, ISBN 978-1-59376-411-1.
- Inspired by True Events: An Illustrated Guide to More Than 500 History-Based Films. Santa Barbara, California, ABC-CLIO, 2013, ISBN 978-1-61069-198-7.
- The Cinema of Robert Altman: Hollywood Maverick. New York, Columbia University Press, 2016, ISBN 978-0-23185-086-5.
- 100 Great War Movies: The Real History Behind the Films. Santa Barbara, California, ABC-CLIO, 2018, ISBN 978-1-44083-385-4.
- Fascist Kitsch: Reprising the 'Art' of Thomas Kinkade NEPCA 2012 Annual Conference
