= Yale Center for Emotional Intelligence =

Research center at Yale University

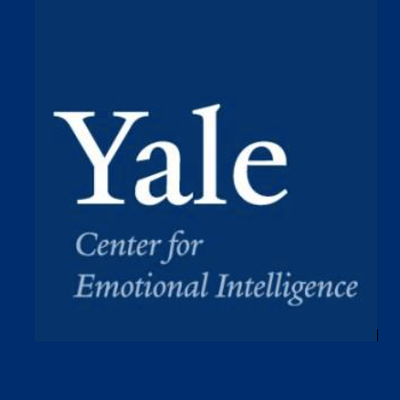
- Abbreviation: YCEI
- Founder: Mark Brackett
- Type: Research center
- Location: New Haven, Connecticut, United States
- Website: https://www.ycei.org/

The Yale Center for Emotional Intelligence is a unit within the Yale Child Study Center at the Yale School of Medicine’s Child Study Center that designs and researches evidence-based approaches for supporting school communities in understanding the value of emotions, teaching and practicing the skills of emotional intelligence, and building and sustaining positive emotional climates. The Yale Center for Emotional Intelligence (YCEI) provides training to school and district leaders, teachers, and school staff to support the systemic implementation of Social and Emotional Learning (SEL) and foster SEL skills in all stakeholders in these communities. YCEI's mission is to use the power of emotions to create a healthier, more equitable, productive and compassionate society today and for future generations.

== Research ==
Its research focuses on four research categories: assessment; school and the workplace; creativity; and RULER, the center's defining approach to social emotional learning. YCEI’s research in “basic” science has included the role of self-awareness in teacher decision-making, the benefits of emotion regulation skills for creativity and adolescent coping, and connections among school climate, teacher engagement, and student academic performance. Research also is conducted on the implementation fidelity and quality of RULER, the evidence-based approach to SEL developed at the YCEI.

The YCEI is funded by foundation and federal grants, corporate support, training revenue, and philanthropists. Facebook and the Dalio Foundation are among them.

On October 24, 2015, the YCEI collaborated with singer-songwriter Lady Gaga and the Born This Way Foundation to host the Emotion Revolution summit at the Yale School of Management, where they presented a landmark study of 22,000 high school students. This study revealed that the most common words students used to describe their emotions at school were “tired,” “stressed,” and “bored.” The summit brought together 200 high school students, policy makers, and academic officials, to discuss ways to recognize and channel emotions for positive outcomes.

The center founded InspirEd, an open-source toolkit for educators to learn and teach emotional intelligence in their classrooms.

On January 19, 2021, Dena Simmons resigned from her founding position as Assistant Director after seven years, citing tokenism and discrimination in the workplace.
