= Marc Brackett =

American research psychologist

- Education: University of New Hampshire
- Known for: RULER, mood meter, emotional literacy blueprint, meta-moment, emotional intelligence charter
- Scientific career
- Fields: Psychology
- Workplaces: Yale University Yale Center for Emotional Intelligence
- Doctoral advisor: John D. Mayer

Marc A. Brackett is an American research psychologist and writer. He is the founding director of the Yale Center for Emotional Intelligence, a professor in the Child Study Center at Yale University and the author of Permission to Feel and Dealing With Feeling: Use Your Emotions to Create the Life You Want.

== Early life and education ==
Brackett grew up in Northern New Jersey. His father was an air-conditioning salesman. Brackett was bulimic as a child and suffered sexual abuse as a child by a neighbor and as a result felt socially isolated. He earned his undergraduate degree at Rutgers University. Shortly before he was scheduled to take the GREs, his mother died.

Brackett earned his Ph.D. in psychology from the University of New Hampshire in 2003, where he was supervised by emotional intelligence scholar John D. Mayer. He was a postdoctoral fellow at Yale University with Mayer's collaborator, Peter Salovey. In an effort to decrease and prevent online bullying, Brackett, himself bullied in school, worked with Facebook on large-scale research project to help other teens being bullied on the social platform.

== Academic career ==
Brackett's research focuses on the role of emotional intelligence in learning, decision making, relationship quality, and mental health; the measurement of emotional intelligence; best practices for bringing emotional intelligence into schools and organizations; and the influences of emotional intelligence training on student and educator effectiveness, bullying prevention, and school climate.

He is the author, co-author, and editor of over 125 scholarly publications and the author of two books: Permission to Feel (2019) and Dealing With Feeling: Use Your Emotions to Create the Life You Want.

== RULER ==
Brackett is the lead developer of RULER, an evidence-based approach to social emotional learning that has been approved by CASEL (Collaborative for Academic, Social, and Emotional Learning). The acronym RULER refers to the five key emotion skills of Recognizing, Understanding, Labeling, Expressing, and Regulating emotions. RULER intends to increase personal wellbeing, effective teaching and leadership, academic achievement, and classroom emotional climate change. An essential aspect of RULER is that it involves training for educational leaders, teachers, support staff, students and families. To date, RULER has been adopted by over 3,500 schools across the globe, reaching over 1,000,000 students.

== Publications ==
=== RULER approach to social and emotional learning ===
- Bracket, M. A., & Kremenitzer, J. P., with Maurer, M., Carpenter, M., Rivers, S. E., & Elbertson, N. (Eds.). (2011). Creating emotionally literate classrooms: An introduction to The RULER Approach to Social and Emotional Learning. Portchester, New York: National Professional Resources.
- Brackett, M. A., Rivers, S. E., Reyes, M. R., & Salovey, P. (in press). Enhancing academic performance and social and emotional competence with the RULER Feeling Words Curriculum. Learning and Individual Differences.
- Rivers, S. E., Brackett, M. A., Reyes, M. R., & Salovey, P. (in press). Improving the social and emotional climate of classrooms: A clustered randomized controlled trial testing The RULER Approach. Prevention Science.
- Reyes, M. R., Brackett, M. A., Rivers, S. E., Elbertson, N., & Salovey, P. (in press). The interaction effects of program training, dosage, and implementation quality on targeted student outcomes for The RULER Approach to social and emotional learning, School Psychology Review.
- Brackett, M. A., Patti, J., Stern, R., Rivers, S. E., Elbertson, N., Chisholm, C., & Salovey, P. (2009). A sustainable, skill-based model to building emotionally literate schools. In R. Thompson, M. Hughes, & J. B. Terrell (Eds.), Handbook of developing emotional and social intelligence: Best practices, case studies, and tools (pp. 329–358). New York: John Wiley & Sons, Inc.
- Rivers, S. E., & Brackett, M. A. (2011). Achieving standards in the English language arts (and more) using The RULER Approach to Social and Emotional Learning. Reading and Writing Quarterly, 27, 75–100.

=== Classroom climate ===
- Brackett, M. A., Reyes, M. R., Rivers, S. E., Elbertson, N. E., & Salovey, P. (2011). Classroom Emotional Climate, Teacher Affiliation, and Student Conduct. Journal of Classroom Interactions, 46, 27–46.
- Reyes, M. R., Brackett, M. A., Rivers, S. E., White, M., Mashburn, A. J., & Salovey, P. (in press). Classroom emotional climate, student engagement, and academic achievement, Journal of Educational Psychology.

=== Emotional intelligence and its applications ===
- Brackett, M. A., Rivers, S. E., & Salovey, P. (2011). Emotional intelligence: Personal, Social, Educational, and Workplace Implications. Social and Personality Psychology Compass, 5, 88–103.
- Brackett, M. A., Palomera, R., Mojsa, J., Reyes, M., & Salovey, P. (2010). Emotion regulation ability, job satisfaction, and burnout among British secondary school teachers. Psychology in the Schools, 47, 406–417.
- Rivers, S. E., Brackett, M. A., Cook, M., Omori, M., Sickler, C., & Salovey, P. (in press). Emotion skills as a protective factor for risky behaviors among college students. Journal of College Student Development.
- Brackett, M. A., Rivers, S., Shiffman, S., Lerner, N., & Salovey, P. (2006). Relating emotional abilities to social functioning: A comparison of performance and self-report measures of emotional intelligence. Journal of Personality and Social Psychology, 91, 780–795.
- Brackett, M. A., & Mayer, J. D. (2003). Convergent, discriminant, and incremental validity of competing measures of emotional intelligence. Personality and Social Psychology Bulletin, 29, 1147–1158.

=== Assessment ===
- Brackett, M. A., Reyes, M. R., Rivers, S. E., Elbertson, N., & Salovey, P. (in press). Assessing teachers' beliefs about social and emotional learning. Journal of Psychoeducational Assessment.
- Brackett, M. A., & Geher, G. (2006). Measuring emotional intelligence: Paradigmatic shifts and common ground. In J. Ciarrochi, J. P. Forgas & J. D. Mayer (Eds.), Emotional intelligence and everyday life (2nd ed.) (pp. 27–50). New York, NY: Psychology Press.
- Brackett, M. A., & Salovey, P. (2004). Measuring emotional intelligence as a mental ability with the Mayer-Salovey-Caruso Emotional Intelligence Test. In G. Geher (Ed.), Measurement of Emotional Intelligence (pp. 179–194). Hauppauge, NY: Nova Science Publishers.

== Recognition ==
Much of Brackett's research is being extended to different cultures, including England, Spain, Italy, Australia, and China. In 2009, his work on social emotional learning (SEL) earned him the Joseph E. Zins Award. He received the 2004/2007 award for Excellence in Research, MENSA Education and Research Foundation. In 2017 he was awarded an honorary doctorate from Manhattanville College.

== See also ==
- Paul Ekman
- Daniel Cordaro
- Dacher Keltner
- Emotionally focused therapy
