= Weldon Kees =

American writer, artist, and musician

- Born: Harry Weldon Kees; February 24, 1914; Beatrice, Nebraska, U.S.
- Disappeared: July 18, 1955; Marin County, California, U.S.
- Status: Missing for 71 years, 1 month and 28 days
- Education: Doane University, University of Nebraska (BA), University of Denver (MS)
- Occupations: Poet; painter; musician; filmmaker
- Years active: 1934–1955
- Known for: The Collected Poems of Weldon Kees, Fall Quarter, The Ceremony and other stories
- Movement: American poetry, Beat Generation
- Spouse: Ann (sep. 1954)

Harry Weldon Kees (February 24, 1914 – disappeared July 18, 1955) was an American poet, librarian, painter, literary critic, novelist, playwright, jazz pianist, short story writer, and filmmaker. Despite his brief career, Kees is considered an important mid-twentieth-century poet of the Beat generation, and peer of John Berryman, Elizabeth Bishop, and Robert Lowell. His work has been immensely influential on subsequent generations of poets writing in English and other languages and his collected poems have been included in many anthologies. Harold Bloom lists the publication of Kees's first book The Last Man (1943) as an important event in the chronology of his textbook Modern American Poetry as well as a book worthy of his Western Canon.

== Early life and education ==
Weldon Kees was born in Beatrice, Nebraska, to John Kees, a hardware manufacturer, and Sarah Green Kees, a schoolteacher. The Kees family was well-to-do, John being part owner of F.D. Kees Manufacturing Co., which patented and produced corn-husking hooks as well as innovative products such as a window defroster for automobiles and a moving lawn sprinkler that resembled a farm tractor. Weldon was a precocious child whose playmates included Robert Taylor and whose pastimes included producing his own magazines, giving puppet shows and even acting. He was treated like a small adult by his parents, whom he addressed by their first names.

Kees's worldview and writing were shaped by the Jazz Age and his early adulthood during the Great Depression. By the time he graduated from high school in 1931, he rejected entering the family business and, while at Doane College, decided to become a novelist. He transferred to the University of Missouri, which had a writing program, and then to the University of Nebraska, where he was mentored by the founding editor of the literary journal Prairie Schooner, Lowery C. Wimberley. By the time Kees graduated in 1935, he had already written and published short stories in that journal as well as other literary magazines such as Horizon and Rocky Mountain Review.

While working for the Federal Writers' Project in Lincoln, Nebraska, and after having suffered the rejection of several novels, Kees turned to writing poetry—and, for a time, engaged in union organizing and considered himself a communist. In 1937, Kees moved to Colorado to earn a degree in library science at the University of Denver, which included working as a librarian at the Denver Public Library.

== Career ==
He then became director of the Bibliographical Center of Research for the Rocky Mountain Region, which was used as a model for a national union catalog. That same year, he married Ann Swan.

In early 1941, Kees signed a provisional contract with Alfred A. Knopf for a novel, Fall Quarter, an academic black comedy about a young professor who battles the dreariness and banality of a staid Nebraskan college. Fall Quarter, part surreal, part social commentary, was rejected by Knopf in the days after the bombing of Pearl Harbor, the declaration of war having changed publishing contingencies for war books. A farce about a dystopic heartland would look unpatriotic on Knopf's 1942 list. From this point on, Kees turned from fiction to writing only poetry.

=== New York and Provincetown ===
8XX, oil on canvas, Weldon Kees, 1949

A pacifist, Kees left Denver for New York City, where he believed Selective Service psychiatrists were more likely to declare him unfit for military duty. He had also, during previous visits, made contacts with literary figures such as William Carlos Williams, Edmund Wilson and his then wife Mary McCarthy, Saul Bellow, Dwight Macdonald, Allen Tate, Lionel Trilling, and many others. It was during his first year in New York that he worked as a book and film critic for Time and as newsreel scriptwriter for Paramount News.

With his first book of poems, The Last Man (San Francisco: Colt Press, 1943), Kees quickly established his reputation and his poems began to appear regularly in The New Yorker (which published his first Robinson persona poems, which pathologize the urban man), Poetry, and The Partisan Review. By the time his second book appeared, The Fall of Magicians (New York: Reynal & Hitchcock, 1947), Kees had already been painting for more than a year and had befriended Abstract Expressionism artists, including Willem de Kooning, Robert Motherwell, Hans Hofmann, as well as the critic Clement Greenberg—whose column Kees took over at The Nation from 1948 to 1950.

In 1948, Weldon and Ann Kees began summering at the artist colony at Provincetown, Massachusetts on Cape Cod. In the autumn of that year, Kees had his first one-man show at the Peridot Gallery and one of his paintings was included in a group show of established and rising artists at the Whitney Museum of American Art. Despite these initial successes, Kees's work had very modest sales.

During the summer of 1949, Kees established a cultural symposium series at Provincetown (Forum 49). He also became involved with the so-called the Irascibles, a group of controversial artists led by Robert Motherwell and other prominent Abstract Expressionists who boycotted a modern art exhibit sponsored by the Metropolitan Museum of Art. Kees, though quite active in protesting the conservative jury's selection in his Nation column, became estranged with both the cultural scene in New York and many of its figures. Although invited to pose in Life magazine's famous group photo of the Irascible 18, Kees and his wife Ann had already driven cross-country to San Francisco in late 1950.

=== San Francisco Renaissance and disappearance ===
Renting an apartment in nearby Point Richmond, California, Kees took a job at the Langley Porter Psychiatric Clinic at the University of California, San Francisco, where he worked alongside the anthropologist Gregory Bateson making data films for a study of nonverbal communication. Kees also continued to paint and write poems—and use his film camera to make experimental movies, as well as scoring a film, The Adventures of Jimmy (1951), directed by the poet and filmmaker James Broughton.

From 1951 to 1954, Kees also made many new contacts as well as renewed old ones in the San Francisco Renaissance, among them Kenneth Rexroth and the founder of City Lights Bookstore, Lawrence Ferlinghetti. Kees's poetry, however, did not embrace the kind dionysiac character and became increasingly sardonic and confessional in poems such as "1926."

The porchlight coming on again,
Early November, the dead leaves
Raked in piles, the wicker swing
Creaking. Across the lots
A phonograph is playing Ja-Da.

An orange moon. I see the lives
Of neighbors, mapped and marred
Like all the wars ahead, and R.
Insane, B. with his throat cut,
Fifteen years from now, in Omaha.
I did not know them then.

My airedale scratches at the door.
And I am back from seeing Milton Sills
And Doris Kenyon. Twelve years old.
The porchlight coming on again.

— "1926"

Restless and often estranged from his poetry, Kees began to collaborate with the jazz clarinetist Bob Helm in 1953 on ballads and torch songs (some written for the singer Ketty Lester). Helm had played with Lu Watters and Turk Murphy, both prominent figures in the San Francisco's New Orleans Revival Movement, which Kees preferred over Bebop.

Despite how much energy he put into this venture, which he hoped would bring him some commercial success, Kees found time to produce a fine series of collages. He even had two more one-man shows in New York as well as shows in San Francisco, including an impressive installation at the California Palace of the Legion of Honor. He had also exchanged his film camera for a still camera, and began taking the photographs that would illustrate the book Nonverbal Communication (Berkeley:, University of California Press, 1956), which he wrote with Jurgen Ruesch, psychiatrist and semiotician. Many of these photographs would qualify as art photography as well as scientific data.

In 1954, Kees separated from his wife Ann, whose alcoholism led to a psychotic episode triggered by watching the Army–McCarthy hearings on television. After having her institutionalized, Kees divorced her around the time that his last book appeared, Poems, 1947–1954 (San Francisco, Adrian Wilson, 1954). He then focused on organizing a musical revue, Pick Up the Pieces, which eventually became a much more elaborate venue of literary burlesque, titled Poets Follies, which premiered in January 1955 and featured a stripper reading the poetry of Sarah Teasdale [sic].

Although Poets Follies earned Kees much notoriety, his other projects did not find the same kind of support. A film company ended in a lawsuit. His collaborations with Helm, Lester, and other musicians, although professionally satisfying, did not produce any hit records. A permanent home for the Poets Follies, the Showplace, a large building Kees leased on Folsom Street in the Mission District, was closed by the fire marshal in late May 1955, just days before the premiere of a serious one-act play, The Waiting Room, which Kees had written for three actress friends.

During much of July, Kees spent time with a woman he had met while working at Langley Porter, a Jungian psychiatrist named Virginia Patterson. Like other relationships Kees had following his divorce, this ended abruptly. Kees had also been taking barbiturates for the past two years, which also had intensified his episodes of manic depression.

After visiting his parents in Santa Barbara, California one last time in early July, as well as his friend, the literary critic Hugh Kenner, Kees returned to San Francisco and had dinner with various friends, including Pauline Kael, who appeared as a guest on Kees's film review program on KPFA-FM, Behind the Movie Camera. She noticed the disturbing changes in Kees's demeanor. For several days in mid-July, Kees drank and commiserated with his friend and business partner, the San Francisco newspaperman and novelist Michael Grieg. He even confessed to have tried jumping over the rail of the Golden Gate Bridge, but he could not physically manage it. He talked of going to Mexico as an alternative, a country that fascinated him in books such as Malcolm Lowry's Under the Volcano.

Kees returned to his home in the Marina District on the evening of July 17, 1955. What he did the following day is a mystery. He took a call from Grieg, who told Kees of a possible job offer. Kees also telephoned a friend, the memoirist Janet Richards, seeking her company. On July 19, 1955, Kees's car was found deserted on the Marin County side of the Golden Gate Bridge.

=== Reputation and resurgence ===
The reputation of Weldon Kees has seen as much neglect as it has keen attention. Weeks before his disappearance, a young poet in Florida, Donald Justice, attempted to write Kees a letter of admiration and to send him a sestina he had written since Kees excelled in that form. His letter found its way to Kees's father, John, who eventually gave Justice permission to compile and edit The Collected Poems of Weldon Kees (Iowa City, IA: The Stone Wall Press, 1960), which was subsequently released as a trade paperback in the 1960s. Kees's work attracted the attention of other younger poets and his work gradually became anthologized and received critical attention.

During the 1980s and 1990s, a volume of Kees's correspondence appeared, Weldon Kees and the Midcentury Generation: Letters, 1935–1955 (Lincoln: University of Nebraska Press, 1986) and the poets Dana Gioia and James Reidel reclaimed and drew attention to Kees's fiction, nonfiction, and visual art. Gioia edited The Ceremony and other stories (Port Townsend, WA: Graywolf Press, 1984) and Reidel edited selection of Kees's critical writings in Reviews and Essays: 1936-1955 (Ann Arbor: University of Michigan Press, 1988) and the novel Fall Quarter (Brownsville, OR: Story Line Press, 1990). Reidel eventually produced a biography of Kees, Vanished Act: The Life and Art of Weldon Kees (Lincoln: University of Nebraska Press, 2003). Books and articles about Kees continue to appear. His paintings and collages have also been shown in two major retrospectives.

Kees has attracted admirers who have commented at length about his poetry. The late Joseph Brodsky, as poet laureate for the Library of Congress, wrote this appraisal:

His poems display neither the incoherence of nostalgia for some mentally palatable past nor, however vaguely charted, the possibility of the future. All he had was the present, which was not to his Muse's liking, and eventually not to his own either. His poetry, in other words, is that of the here and now and of no escape, except for poetry itself. Yet for all he had to say about the present, his language is amazingly clear and direct, and the formal aspects of his verse are amazingly conservative. Evidently, Kees did not feel the imperative of arrythmia so palpable among his less memorable peers, not to mention successors.

The literary critic and biographer Ian Hamilton made a special of Kees's existential problem with writing and fame, quoting one of Kees's illustrious friends from his New York period:

According to Alfred Kazin, Weldon Kees's ambition as a poet knew no bounds. He "desperately wanted to be famous", says Kazin, "to be 'up there', as he used to say, with Eliot, Pound and other stars in our firmament". This being so, one has to wonder why Weldon was not more of a hustler on his own behalf. So far as we know, he seems to have done very little in the way of careerist self-advancement—although, to judge from photographs, he was by no means short of vanity. Arrogant, embittered and melancholic, he waited for acclaim to come to him, but none of the three books he published in his lifetime made much of a mark. (One commentator has estimated that Kees sold a total of 1,000 copies of his works before he disappeared.)

Anthony Lane, the film critic of The New Yorker, has also written in kind about Kees's enduring body of work, especially in regard to the Robinson poems:

It is that single word "usual" that brings you up short and lets the poem fan out. It points not just to the regularity of Robinson's own days and years but to the engulfing possibility of a thousand Robinsons out there, in the subway and on the streets, all ticking their lives away like his soundless watch. The poem, entitled "Aspects of Robinson," is the portrait of the postwar man of affairs: neither laborer nor magnate, but holding steady—and, at first blush, looking purposeful—within the middle rank. He is everything that Weldon Kees dreaded, as well as everything that he suspected he ought to be.

On October 23, 2012, Kathleen Rooney's novel-in-poems Robinson Alone was released, of which Donna Seaman from Booklist wrote:

In an extraordinary act of identification, poet and essayist Rooney improvises on Kees' most haunting poems, a quartet featuring an alter ego named Robinson. Her loosely biographical, knowledgeably imaginative, and gorgeously atmospheric story in verse portrays Robinson as a dapper, talented, and bedeviled man who conceals his sorrows behind insouciance. Rooney weaves lines from Kees' writings into her bluesy, funny, and scorching lyrics as she follows Robinson from elation to desolation as his wife succumbs to alcoholism and his dreams fade. Rooney's syncopated wordplay, supple musicality, and cinematic descriptions subtly embody Kees' artistic pursuits as well as Robinson's sardonic grace under pressure. An intricate, psychologically luminous homage, tale of American loneliness, and enthralling testament to poetry's resonance.

== Sources and bibliography ==
- The Last Man (1943) poems
- The Fall of Magicians (1947) poems
- Poems 1947-1954 (1954)
- Nonverbal Communication: Notes On The Visual Perception Of Human Relations (1956) with Jurgen Ruesch
- The Collected Poems of Weldon Kees (1960 and later editions) edited by Donald Justice
- The Ceremony and Other Stories (1984) selected by Dana Gioia
- Weldon Kees and the Midcentury Generation (1986) letters, edited by Robert E. Knoll
- Reviews and Essays, 1936-55 (1988) edited by James Reidel
- Fall Quarter (1990) novel
- Vanished Act: The Life and Art of Weldon Kees (2003) by James Reidel

Further reading

- Bowling, Tim. "Ex Libris." Queen's Quarterly 116, no. 2 (2009): 304+
- Weldon Kees: A Critical Introduction (1985) essays about Kees and a bibliography by Robert "Bob" Niemi
- Weldon Kees (Twayne's United States Author Series, 484) (1985) by William T. Ross
- The Bibliography of Weldon Kees (1997) by Robert Niemi and Daniel Gillane
- Weldon Kees and the Arts at Midcentury (2003) by Daniel A. Siedell
- "Kees to the City," SF Weekly, (July 27-August, 2005) by Matt Smith
- "The Disappearing Poet." The New Yorker (4 July 2005) by Anthony Lane
- Robinson Alone (2012) - a novel in poems based on the life and work of Kees and his character Robinson by Kathleen Rooney
- The Poetry of Weldon Kees: Vanishing as Presence (2017) by John T. Irwin

== See also ==
- List of people who disappeared
