= Jurgen Ruesch =

American psychiatrist (1909–1995)

Jurgen Ruesch (born Jürgen Rüsch; November 9, 1909 – July 8, 1995) was an American psychiatrist.

== Life ==
Jurgen Ruesch was born in Naples, Italy, to Swiss parents. He studied at the University of Zurich, Switzerland, and moved to San Francisco in 1943 to head a project at the newly opened Langley Porter Psychiatric Institute of the University of California, San Francisco. He remained as professor at the University of California until his retirement in 1977; he also maintained a private psychiatric practice.

== Work ==
A 1948 study of his cataloged ways in which sick patients were poorly adapted to their social environments. This had an influence on the study of psychosomatic illness and stress, emphasizing the role of patients' inability to adapt to environmental situations, rather than focusing on internal psychic conflict, as had been the approach of Franz Alexander.

Ruesch's work continued around the general concept of environmental adaptation and it remained consistent in this respect throughout his career. The early volume Communication: The Social Matrix of Psychiatry (1951, with Gregory Bateson) situates his work alongside and in some senses intertwined with his coauthor, a well known anthropologist who also focused upon systems and adaptation. Ruesch's own work in psychiatry was already quite advanced in this area—his essays from 1953 and on were focused upon the child's need to adapt in the family of upbringing, the idea that this adaptation to others was at the same time the organizing of personality and identity as performance habits and then the consequence of applying this habitual performance system in the broader social milieu—consequences that in some cases were favorable and in others disastrous. Ruesch was also aware that the broader social milieu was composed of a great number of sub-systems to which one must adapt including (1) the schoolhouse (2) the sports field (3) the dating scene (4) the romantic relationship, (5) the employment site, (6) the Church, to name a few. In the book Therapeutic Communication, Ruesch largely explained his general theory of how prior training could create either hazard for people in terms of how they interpret and respond to new environments and then his primary clinical contribution: the notion that treatment of this inadequacy of "social techniques", in particular those associated with communication could resolve pathology expressed in terms of physical (e.g., ulcers), intrapsychic (e.g., anxiety), and interpersonal (e.g., unstable relationships) problems. This "therapeutic" counseling focused on the interpretation and production of communicative action as a social technique. In "Disturbed Communication", written earlier, Ruesch focuses upon much of what is described above in terms of failure to adapt from social techniques of origin to social techniques of imminent systems.

Nonverbal Communication, much like McLuhan's "The Mechanical Bride", Goffman's "Gender Studies" and a variety of other publications in that era, was largely a picture book—the pictures displaying conventional images of people with discussions of how these images displayed in images (what Ruesch described as metacommunication and analogic communication, depending upon the time he wrote). The volume was intended to provide a context for understanding that the meaning of utterances (word-sets) was dependent upon the performative elements surrounding them). For Ruesch this idea of word-set utterances (digital message) being interpreted alongside performance features (analogic content) such as location, equipment, and gestures was critical to the understanding of the event. This would be true for the family of origin and the social systems in which the adult moves. For example, the digital content of the word set "I don't want to live without you" varies in its meaning, depending on whether the speaker says it on one knee holding an engagement ring and roses or whether he shouts it from the ledge of a 20-story window. This book is understood as the semiotics of Ruesch, but the volume does not represent his transition to semiotics in any more degree that it was much earlier. The volume "Semiotic Approaches to Human Relations" for example, does not in its 800 pages, represent Ruesch's attempts to fathom semiotics in its post-Rolande-Barthes era. It is instead an attempt to find a location for publication of the collected essays of Jurgen Ruesch. The volume appears in Thomas Sebeok's impressive series called "Semiotics and Human Relations". It appears that Sebeok had been given discretion with respect to the series and that he was interested in the monumental publications of Ruesch (who purportedly coined the expression 'nonverbal communication') starting 20 years earlier in journals. The extensive Table of contents, however, locates the term "semiotics" on only 3 pages in the 800 page work. Semiotics was, indeed a critical term in Ruesch but commonly equal and related were sign, signal, statement, message, and so forth—many of them having dramatically changed in their characterization over the last 5 decades. The work thus hovers between the classical and outdated, so that it must be read with a critical eye. It is nevertheless genius.

Ruesch has several other works of merit in his legacy. He deserves a better place in intellectual history than he has received—a place of the sort Sebeok attempted to give him by publishing the collection. Secondary writers who reconstitute Ruesch's work in contemporary forms are necessary, however.

Nonverbal Communication (1956, with Weldon Kees). He later took a more semiotic approach, collected in the volume Semiotic Approaches to Human Relations (1972). Until recently, no pictures of Ruesch have been available and others such as Hands Ruesch, Bateson, and Prouhdon have appeared in his place. The errors can be avoided through dust jacket images presented herein.

== Publications ==
- Ruesch, Jurgen; Bateson, Gregory (1951). Communication: The Social Matrix of Psychiatry. New York: W.W. Norton. OL 12269244W.
- Ruesch, Jurgen (1965). "Social Psychiatry: An Overview". Arch Gen Psychiatry. 12 (5): 501–509. doi:10.1001/archpsyc.1965.01720350069009. PMID 14279541.
- Ruesch, Jurgen; Kees, Weldon (1956). Nonverbal Communication: Notes on the Visual Perception of Human Relations. Berkeley: University of California Press. LCCN 55-11228.
- Ruesch, Jurgen (1961). Therapeutic Communication. New York: W.W. Norton. LCCN 61-11345.
- Ruesch, Jurgen (1957). Disturbed Communication: The Clinical Assessment of Normal and Pathological Communicative Behavior. New York: W.W. Norton & Co. LCCN 57-5992. OL 1590655W. 337 pp.
- Ruesch, Jurgen (1970). Semiotic Approaches to Human Relations. De Gruyter. ISBN 9789027922991. 804 pp.
- Ruesch, Jurgen (1975). Knowledge in Action: Communication, Social Operations, and Management. New York: Jason Aronson, Inc. ISBN 0-87668-201-8. LCCN 75-2489. 352 pp.
- Ruesch, Jurgen (1978). Langley Porter Institute and Psychiatry in Northern California: 1943-1975. San Francisco: Friends of Langley Porter Institute. LCCN 78-102835. OL 1590651W. 136 pp.
