= Breaktime (organization) =

Non-profit organization in Massachusetts, US

- Founded: 2018; 8 years ago
- Founders: Connor Schoen and Tony Shu
- Type: 501(c)(3) organization
- Headquarters: 63 Franklin Street, Boston, MA 02110
- Location: Boston, Massachusetts, U.S.
- Coordinates: 42.36404°N 71.06192°W
- Website: breaktime.org

Breaktime is a 501(c)(3) non-profit based in Boston, Massachusetts, which works to reduce young adult homelessness through transitional employment.

Breaktime employs young adults experiencing homelessness in living wage job opportunities. The organization provides its program participants with job training, job placement and then years of support. During 2020, the company employed 25 young adults that were experiencing homelessness, who worked to address food insecurity in the community, preparing and delivering over 650,000 meals to people experiencing food insecurity throughout Greater Boston. Since then, Breaktime has employed almost 200 young adults in the Greater Boston Area.

In 2024, Breaktime opened a hub for solving young adult homelessness in its new Downtown Boston location. The office is equipped with showers, laundry machines, donated food and clothes, and a job training space. The building's lower floors are reserved for future partnerships with local organizations, including with Boston Health Care for the Homeless.

Cofounders Connor Schoen and Tony Shu were honored in the 2021 Forbes 30 Under 30 listing for Breaktime's social impact in reducing young adult homelessness.

== History ==
Cofounders Schoen and Shu met as Harvard undergraduate students while working at the homeless shelter, Y2Y, in Harvard Square. Schoen and Shu founded Breaktime in 2018. Breaktime became Boston’s first transitional employment program specifically tailored to young adults experiencing homelessness.

In collaboration with the Community Works Service in Boston, Breaktime launched its first program, the Double Impact Initiative, in response to the global pandemic. This program employs young adults experiencing homelessness to make and distribute meals for Bostonians experiencing food insecurity. The young adult associates work at local job sites like food pantries while also receiving above-minimum wages with matched savings and career counseling.

In December 2024, Breaktime purchased its downtown office building at 63 Franklin Street for $6.3 million. Offering comprehensive services to young adults experiencing homelessness, the space will include dedicated areas for career training, laundry, showers, and a health clinic. The new building boasts proximity to Boston's transit infrastructure, making its program accessible to young adults across the area.

== Programs ==
=== Program ===
Breaktime's yearlong program consists of workplace training, followed by a three-month job placement at a nonprofit or small business, in addition to credit counseling. Breaktime provides support for many young adults experiencing homelessness who identify as LGBTQ+ and/or were raised in the foster care system. Breaktime provides support for its program graduates for many years after graduation as well.

Breaktime is partnered with a dozen small businesses. Program participants earn valuable work experience. Breaktime co-funds employee wages, so small businesses access trained workers at reduced costs..

Participants (associates) in Breaktime's program attend a 3-week training program to explore their skills and potential career paths. After completing training, associates work at a three-month job placement site with a small business or nonprofit. Upon graduation, associates continue to receive nine months of regular check-ins and financial counseling and support from Breaktime.

According to Breaktime, 83% of program alumni are working and are in school compared to 12% prior to Breaktime. Breaktime alumni experience a 33% increase in wages and 77% of alumni are now in stable housing.

== Fundraising and partnerships ==
Breaktime is a part of the City of Boston's long term plan, "Rising to the Challenge," to end young adult homelessness in Boston and is one of the 54 recipients of the City of Boston's 2022 Youth Development Fund, which provides $1.25 million in funding for youth and young adult violence prevention.

Breaktime is backed by supporters including the City of Boston, Liberty Mutual, Black Rock, Boston Resiliency Fund, The American Heart Association, Born This Way Foundation, Forest Foundation, William and Anngenette Tyler Fidelity Fund, MassMutual Foundation, John Hancock, Riley Foundation, and Martin Richard Foundation

Breaktime is also partnered with organizations including the Cape Verdean Association of Boston, Jewish Family & Children's Services, Project Hope, and Sojourner House.
