= BDA (TSA program) =

Behavior Detection and Analysis (BDA), until 2016 called Screening of Passengers by Observation Techniques (SPOT), is a program launched in the United States by the Transportation Security Administration (TSA) to identify potential terrorists among people at an airport by a set of 94 criteria, all of which are signs for either stress, fear, or deception according to controversial research on so-called "microexpressions," primarily espoused by American psychologist Paul Ekman. Passengers meeting enough of the criteria are, under the program, referred for a patdown and additional screening. The criteria were initially secret, but in March 2015, The Intercept published them after obtaining the information from an anonymous source.

== History ==
The TSA began training agents in the program in 2006, in response to the liquid bomb plot in Britain earlier that year, and officially began the program at airports across the U.S. in 2007. As of 2013, none of the few arrests that had resulted from the program had been for terrorism or related charges. Originally, the program was based on the Facial Action Coding System designed by psychologist Paul Ekman in the late 1970s to allow psychologists to identify emotions via facial "microexpressions".

In 2016, the TSA renamed the program to Behavior Detection and Analysis.

== Scale ==
As of 2015, there were about 2,800 TSA employees working in the SPOT program. During the first six years of the program's history (2007-2013), $900 million had been spent on it.

== Reactions ==
Critics of SPOT have argued that it results in racial profiling of airport passengers, and that it has produced few results. In 2010, the Government Accountability Office (GAO) released a report criticizing the TSA for deploying the program at airports throughout the country without providing scientific validation of how it could be effective.

On April 6, 2011, Philip Rubin provided testimony at a hearing of the United States House Committee on Oversight and Reform - Behavioral Science and Security: Evaluating TSA's SPOT Program. Rubin is a psychologist who had served as Chair of the National Research Council (NRC) Committee on Field Evaluation of Behavioral and Cognitive Sciences-Based Methods and Tools for Intelligence and Counter-Intelligence. He was also a member of the NRC Committee on Developing Metrics for Department of Homeland Security Science and Technology Research. In his written and oral congressional testimony, he criticized the TSA's SPOT passenger screening program, including raising concerns about the limitations that the Department of Homeland Security imposed on an outside review and oversight committee for the SPOT program, known as the Technical Advisory Committee (TAC), of which he was a member, saying "TAC has not been asked to evaluate the overall SPOT program, the validity of indicators used in the program, consistency across measurement, field conditions, training issues, scientific foundations of the program and/or behavioral detection methodologies, etc. In order to appropriately scientifically evaluate a program like SPOT, all of these and more would be needed." He went on to say, "Shining a light on the process by making information on methodologies and results as open as possible (such as with devices like the polygraph, ..., voice stress analysis, and neuroimaging) is necessary for determining if these technologies and devices are performing in a known and reliable manner. Clearly establishing the scientific validity of underlying premises, foundations, primitives, is essential. The larger the base of comparable scientific studies, the easier it is to establish the validity of techniques and approaches. ... In our desire to protect our citizens from those who intend to harm us, we must make sure that our own behavior is not unnecessarily shaped by things like fear, urgency, institutional incentives or pressures, financial considerations, career and personal goals, the selling of snake oil, etc., that lead to the adoption of approaches that have not been sufficiently and appropriately scientifically vetted."

In 2012, TSA employees in Boston denounced the program and estimated that 80% of those who were pulled from security lines under it were minorities.

In 2013, two reports (one by the Department of Homeland Security Office of Inspector General and one by the GAO) harshly criticized SPOT on the basis that there was little evidence the program was effective. The GAO report also recommended that the program be defunded.

In response to these reports, John S. Pistole, the then-director of the TSA, told Congress that he worked on the program as part of his attempt to shift the agency toward risk-based assessment of passengers, which he developed in response to criticisms of the agency's one-size-fits-all approach to screening.

In 2017, the ACLU released a report concluding that the reports and studies cited by the TSA to defend SPOT undermined the premises on which the program was based. The ACLU obtained these reports and studies after winning a lawsuit they filed against the TSA in 2015, after the agency failed to respond to a Freedom of Information Act request. An unrelated 2017 GAO report on aviation security measures in general criticized the BDA program, but described that the TSA had reduced the level of funding for it pursuant to the recommendations of the 2013 GAO report. Funding for the program in FY 2015, the period investigated by the report, amounted to $189.4 million.

A 2020 paper published in Anuario de Psicología Jurídica criticized the program as pseudoscientific after analyzing the various audit reports and the material the TSA provided in support of the program.
