= Cynthia Germanotta =

American philanthropist (born 1954)

- Born: Cynthia Louise Bissett; August 30, 1954 (age 72); Wheeling, West Virginia, U.S.
- Education: West Virginia University; George Washington University (MPA)
- Occupations: Philanthropist; activist; entrepreneur
- Spouse: Joe Germanotta (m. 1983)
- Children: 2, including Gaga

Cynthia Louise Germanotta (née Bissett; born August 30, 1954) is an American philanthropist, activist and entrepreneur. She is the president of the Born This Way Foundation, which she co-founded with her daughter, singer Lady Gaga, in 2012.

== Early life, education, and career ==
Germanotta was born Cynthia Louise Bissett on August 30, 1954, in Wheeling, West Virginia, where she was also raised. Her parents were Paul Douglas Bissett (April 7, 1926 – March 31, 2013), a State Farm insurance agent who sang with the McMechen Men's Chorus and the McMechen Methodist Choir, and Veronica Rose Ferrie (February 2, 1928 – December 12, 2022). She is of Italian descent through her mother and English, Scottish and German descent through her father. She has an older brother, Paul, and a younger sister, Cheryl Ann.

Germanotta graduated from John Marshall High School in Glen Dale, West Virginia. She then attended West Virginia University and earned a master's degree in public administration from George Washington University. While at West Virginia University, Germanotta was a cheerleader and a member of Chi Omega.

Germanotta worked for Verizon as a telecommunications executive in sales and management.

== Philanthropy and activism ==
In 2012, Germanotta and her daughter, Lady Gaga, co-founded the Born This Way Foundation, a non-profit organization focused on inspiring youth, ending bullying, and building up communities. Germanotta was honored by Boston PFLAG and by Dancing Classrooms for her advocacy regarding youth mental health.

Germanotta is an advocate for the Women's Council on Heart Health for the Ronald O. Perelman Heart Institute and serves on the board of the Empowerment Initiative at the University of Nebraska–Lincoln. She also served on the Ladies Auxiliary Committee of The Columbus Citizens Foundation, for which she received the Humanitarian Award in 2015. As of 2016, she serves as a member of the Board of Governors for the Parsons School of Design.

On June 10, 2018, Germanotta addressed the United Nations General Assembly on behalf of the Born This Way Foundation and launched the United for Global Mental Health initiative. On May 20, 2019, the United Nations' World Health Organization announced that Germanotta would be one of four new Goodwill Ambassadors, as the ambassador for mental health.

== Personal life ==
Germanotta is married to Joseph Germanotta, an internet entrepreneur and restaurateur. The couple have two daughters, Stefani (Lady Gaga) (born 1986) and Natali (born 1992). Germanotta is Catholic and is a parishioner at the Church of the Blessed Sacrament in New York City. In 2017, she appeared in the documentary Gaga: Five Foot Two.
