= Animal love =

Animal love or animal lover may refer to:

- Human-animal bonding, affectional relationships between humans and companion animals
- Concern for animal welfare, the well-being of all animals
- Emotion in animals
- Pair bond, affectional bonding between animals
- Zoophilia, sexual relationships between humans and animals
- Animal Love, a 1996 documentary film directed by Ulrich Seidl
