= Laughter in animals =

Overview of humor in animals

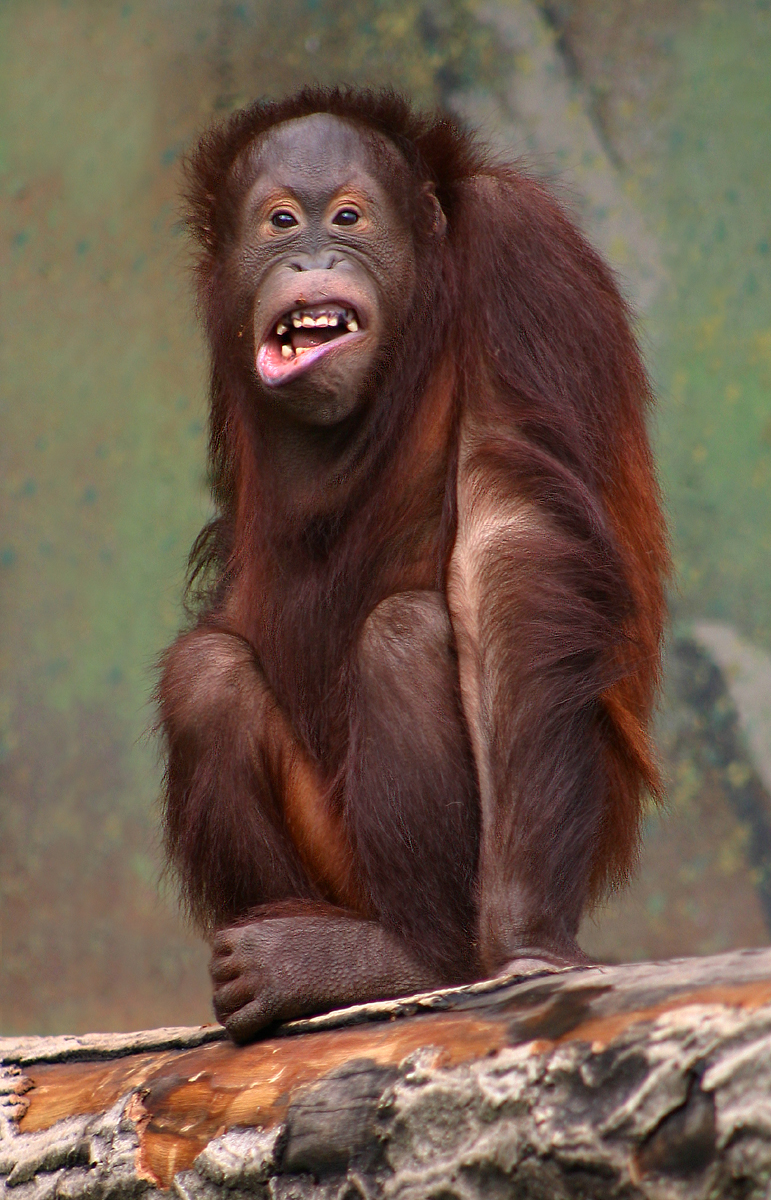
An orangutan laughing

Laughter in animals other than humans describes animal behavior which resembles human laughter.

Several non-human species demonstrate vocalizations that sound similar to human laughter. A significant proportion of these species are mammals, which suggests that the neurological functions occurred early in the process of mammalian evolution. Laughter as communication is found in over 60 species.

== Apes ==
Chimpanzees, bonobos, gorillas and orangutans show laughter-like vocalizations in response to physical contact such as wrestling, play chasing or tickling. Some orangutans also react with laughter at magic tricks performed by humans. This behavior is documented in both wild and captive chimpanzees. Chimpanzee laughter is not readily recognizable to humans as such, because it is generated by alternating inhalations and exhalations that sound more like breathing and panting. It sounds similar to screeching. The differences between chimpanzee and human laughter may be the result of adaptations that have evolved to enable human speech. One study analyzed sounds made by human babies and bonobos when tickled. It found that although the bonobo's laugh was a higher frequency, the laugh followed the same sonographic pattern as human babies and included similar facial expressions. Humans and chimpanzees share similar ticklish areas of the body such as the armpits and belly.

Research has noted the similarity in forms of laughter among humans and other apes (chimpanzees, gorillas and orangutans) when tickled, suggesting that laughter derived from a common origin among primate species, and therefore evolved prior to the origin of humans.

== Rats ==
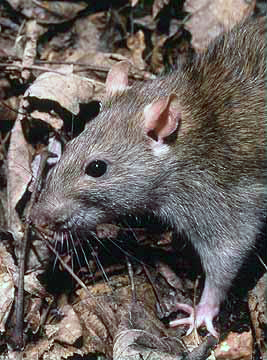
Brown rats emit 50-kHz calls during rough and tumble play, and when tickled.

Rats emit long, 50-kHz ultrasonic calls that are induced during rough and tumble play, and when tickled by humans. The vocalization is described as distinct "chirping". Like humans, rats have "tickle skin", areas of the body that generate greater laughter responses than others. Rats that laugh the most also play the most and prefer to spend more time with other laughing rats. It has been reported that there is no decline in the tendency to laugh and respond to tickle skin as rats age, but it has also been reported that in females, brain maturation after puberty appears to redefine tickling as aversive, leading to avoidance rather than appetitive responses. Further studies show that rats chirp when wrestling one another, before receiving morphine, or when mating. The sound has been interpreted as an expectation of something rewarding. High frequency ultrasonic vocalizations are important in rat communication and function to elicit approach behavior in the recipient.

The initial goal of research by Jaak Panksepp and Jeff Burgdorf was to track the biological origins of how the brain processes emotions and social behavior. They compared rat vocalizations during social interactions to the joy and laughter commonly experienced by children in social play. They concluded that the 50-kHz rat vocalizations might reflect positive affective states (feelings or emotions), analogous to those experienced by children laughing during social play.

More recent studies have investigated the emotional states of rats after being tickled. An animal's optimism or pessimism can be assessed by cognitive bias studies. After being tickled, rats are more optimistic, indicating the interaction invokes a positive affective state. Furthermore, rats self-administer playback of the 50-kHz trill calls and avoid playback of 22-kHz calls.

When rats are given naloxone (an opioid antagonist), tickling no longer evokes the 50-kHz vocalisation which indicates that the rewarding properties of tickling are modulated by endogenous opioids.

== Dogs ==
Dogs sometimes pant in a manner that sounds like a human laugh. Analysis using a sonograph reveals that this pant varies with bursts of frequencies. When this vocalization is played to dogs in a shelter setting, it can initiate play, promote pro-social behavior, and decrease stress levels. One study compared the behaviour of 120 dogs with and without exposure to a recorded "dog-laugh". Playback reduced stress-related behaviors, increased tail wagging, the display of a "play-face" when playing was initiated, and pro-social behavior such as approaching and lip licking.

== Dolphins ==
In 2004, researchers who were studying dolphins in Sweden noticed a particular set of sounds that they had not heard before. These sounds consisted of a short burst of pulses, followed by a whistle. After further observations the researchers discovered that these signals were being made by dolphins only during play-fighting, and never during aggressive confrontations. Their conclusion was that these sounds were being made by the dolphins to indicate that the situation was pleasant and/or non-threatening, and to help prevent it escalating into something like a real fight. This, according to psychologists, is the reason laughter exists in the first place, suggesting these noises were the dolphin equivalent of a human laugh.
