= Empathy in chickens =

Empathy in chickens is the ability of a chicken to understand and share the feelings of another chicken. The Biotechnology and Biological Sciences Research Council's (BBSRC) Animal Welfare Initiative defines and recognizes that "...hens possess a fundamental capacity to empathise..." These empathetic responses in animals are well documented and are usually discussed along with issues related to cognition. The difference between animal cognition and animal emotion is recognized by ethicists. The specific emotional attribute of empathy in chickens has not been only investigated in terms of its existence but it has applications that have resulted in the designed reduction of stress in farm-raised poultry.

== Definition ==
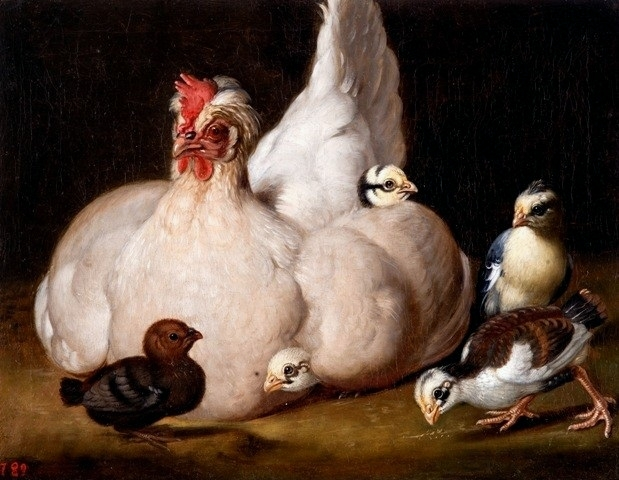
Hamilton White hen with chicks

The difference between animal cognition and animal emotion is recognized by ethicists. Animal cognition covers all aspects related to the thought processes in animals. Though the topics related to cognition such as self-recognition, memory, other emotions and problem-solving have been investigated, the ability to share the emotional state of another chicken has now been established in hens.

"We found that adult female birds possess at least one of the essential underpinning attributes of 'empathy'; the ability to be affected by, and share, the emotional state of another."

Chickens have the basic foundations of emotional empathy. Empathy is sometimes regarded as a form of emotional intelligence and is demonstrated when hens display signs of anxiety when they observed their chicks in distressful situations. The hens have been said to "feel their chicks' pain" and to "be affected by, and share, the emotional state of another."

== Scientific evidence ==
A study funded by the BBSRC and published in 2011 was the first to demonstrate that chickens possess empathy and the first study to use both behavioral and physiological methods to measure these traits in birds. Chicks were exposed to a puff of air, which they find mildly distressing. During the exposure, their mother's behaviour and physiological responses were monitored non-invasively. The hens altered their behaviour by decreased preening, increased alertness, and an increased numbers of vocalisations directed to their chicks — behaviours interpreted as a demonstration of concern. Furthermore, the hens' heart rate increased and eye temperature decreased.

In a 2012 follow-up study, the same researchers repeated the air-puff procedure with hens observing familiar-but-unrelated adults rather than chicks. They found that the adult hens "actually produced slightly more alarm and warning vocalisations than the chicks in the previous study produced distress vocalisations", but that "the only response detected in the observer hens was an increase in sitting. ... There was no indication of heightened physiological arousal and the sitting posture more likely indicated that hens were in a calmer, more 'relaxed' state." They concluded that the "result clearly shows that empathic responses in hens are not facilitated by warning or alarm vocalisations". They felt that further study was warranted, perhaps with related adults, or with stimuli that prompted distress signals rather than alarm or warning signals.

== Other emotions ==
=== Fear ===
Previous investigations established the indicators of an emotional response in chickens. Domestic chickens can be observed to have different states of alertness. Hens exhibit fear by increasing the time spent standing alert and increased preening. Before empathy in chickens was reported, other investigations demonstrated that hens avoid environments associated with higher preening rates and standing.

=== Stress and empathy ===
Empathetic response by hens is preceded by the determination that hens recognize distress in their chicks. Assessing the distress of chicks and the effect of the presence of their mother has been investigated using an air-puff treatment. Each treatment chick and control were exposed to puffs of air applied to their eyes in the presence and absence of their mothers. The responses interpreted as distress in the chicks were:

- reduced temperature of the eye of the chick
- increased ground pecking
- increased preening
- increased standing (compared to normal rates of movement)

The response of the hens to the apparent distress of their chicks differed to those not exhibiting distress. When distress was recognized by a hen, her heart rate increased. This is correlated to the degree of distress exhibited by the chicks. If the hen is present, distress associated behaviours are less in the chick. Demonstrating empathy by hens toward their chicks is accompanied by the reduction of distress in the chicks.

== Applications ==
The specific emotional attribute of empathy in chickens has not been only investigated in terms of its existence but it has applications that have resulted in the designed reduction of stress in farm-raised poultry.

At one time, a Virginia prison was planned to be transformed into 'Chicken empathy museum' by PETA to raise awareness of the emotional, empathetic nature of chickens.

== See also ==
- Animal communication
- Emotion in non-human animals
