= Emotion in animals =

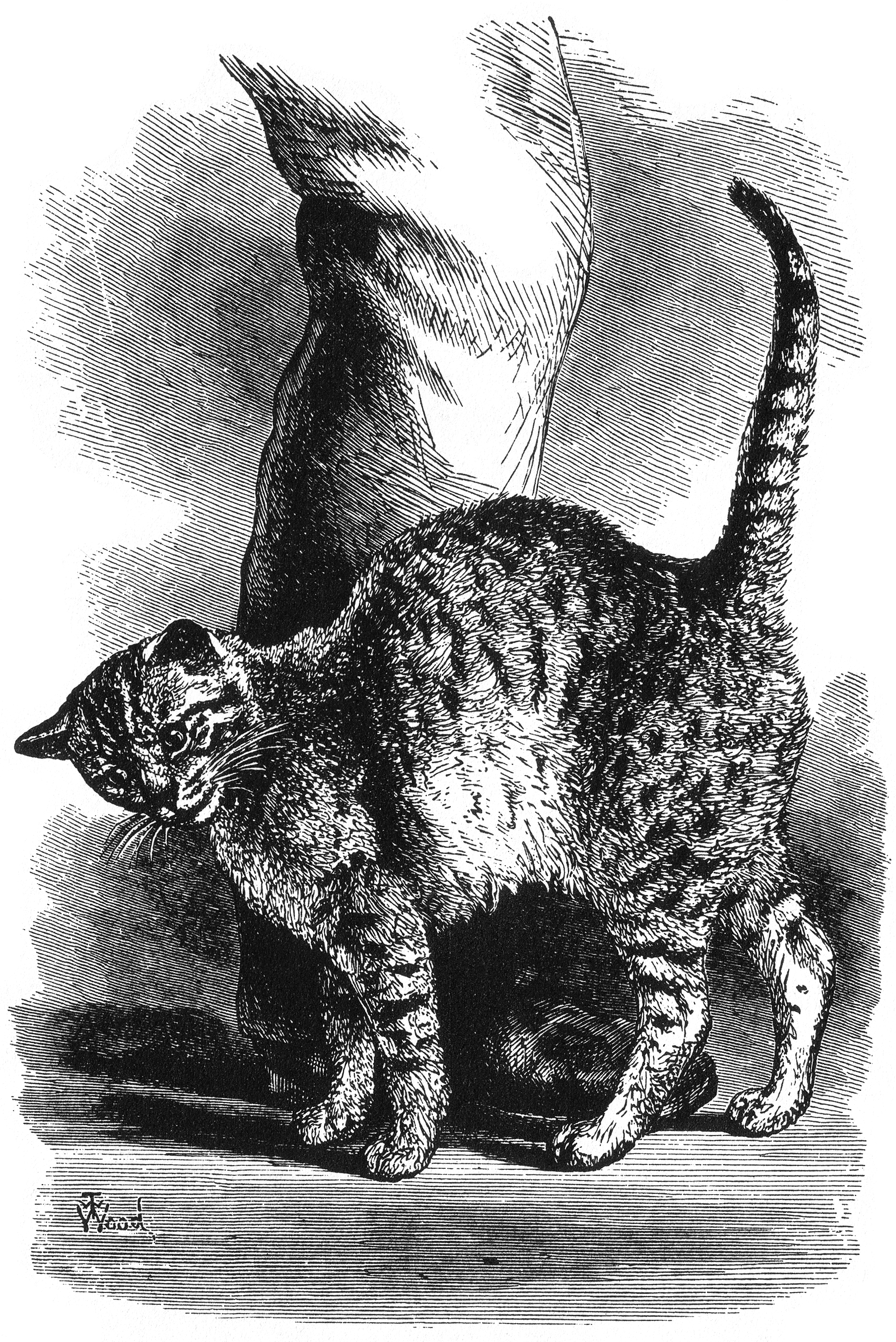
A drawing of a cat by T. W. Wood in Charles Darwin's book The Expression of the Emotions in Man and Animals, described as acting "in an affectionate frame of mind".

Emotion is defined as any mental experience with high intensity and high hedonic content. The existence and nature of emotions in non-human animals are believed to be correlated with those of humans and to have evolved from the same mechanisms. Charles Darwin was one of the first scientists to write about the subject, and his observational (and sometimes anecdotal) approach has since developed into a more robust, hypothesis-driven, scientific approach. Cognitive bias tests and learned helplessness models have shown feelings of optimism and pessimism in a wide range of species, including rats, dogs, cats, rhesus macaques, sheep, chicks, starlings, pigs, and honeybees. Jaak Panksepp played a large role in the study of animal emotion, basing his research on the neurological aspect. Mentioning seven core emotional feelings reflected through a variety of neuro-dynamic limbic emotional action systems, including seeking, fear, rage, lust, care, panic and play. Through brain stimulation and pharmacological challenges, such emotional responses can be effectively monitored.

Emotion has been observed and further researched through multiple different approaches including that of behaviourism, comparative, anecdotal, specifically Darwin's approach and what is most widely used today: the scientific approach which has a number of subfields including functional, mechanistic, cognitive bias tests, self-medicating, spindle neurons, vocalizations and neurology.

While emotions in nonhuman animals are still quite a controversial topic, it has been studied in an extensive array of species both large and small including primates, rodents, elephants, horses, birds, dogs, cats, honeybees and crayfish.

== Etymology, definitions, and differentiation ==
The word "emotion" dates back to 1579, when it was adapted from the French word émouvoir, which means "to stir up". However, the earliest precursors of the word likely date back to the very origins of language.

Emotions have been described as discrete and consistent responses to internal or external events which have a particular significance for the organism. Emotions are brief in duration and consist of a coordinated set of responses, which may include physiological, behavioural, and neural mechanisms. Emotions have also been described as the result of evolution because they provided good solutions to ancient and recurring problems that faced ancestors.

=== Laterality ===
It has been proposed that negative, withdrawal-associated emotions are processed predominantly by the right hemisphere, whereas the left hemisphere is largely responsible for processing positive, approach-related emotions. This has been called the "laterality-valence hypothesis".

=== Basic and complex human emotions ===
In humans, a distinction is sometimes made between "basic" and "complex" emotions. Six emotions have been classified as basic: anger, disgust, fear, happiness, sadness and surprise. Complex emotions would include contempt, jealousy and sympathy. However, this distinction is difficult to maintain, and animals are often said to express even the complex emotions.

== Background ==
=== Behaviourist approach ===
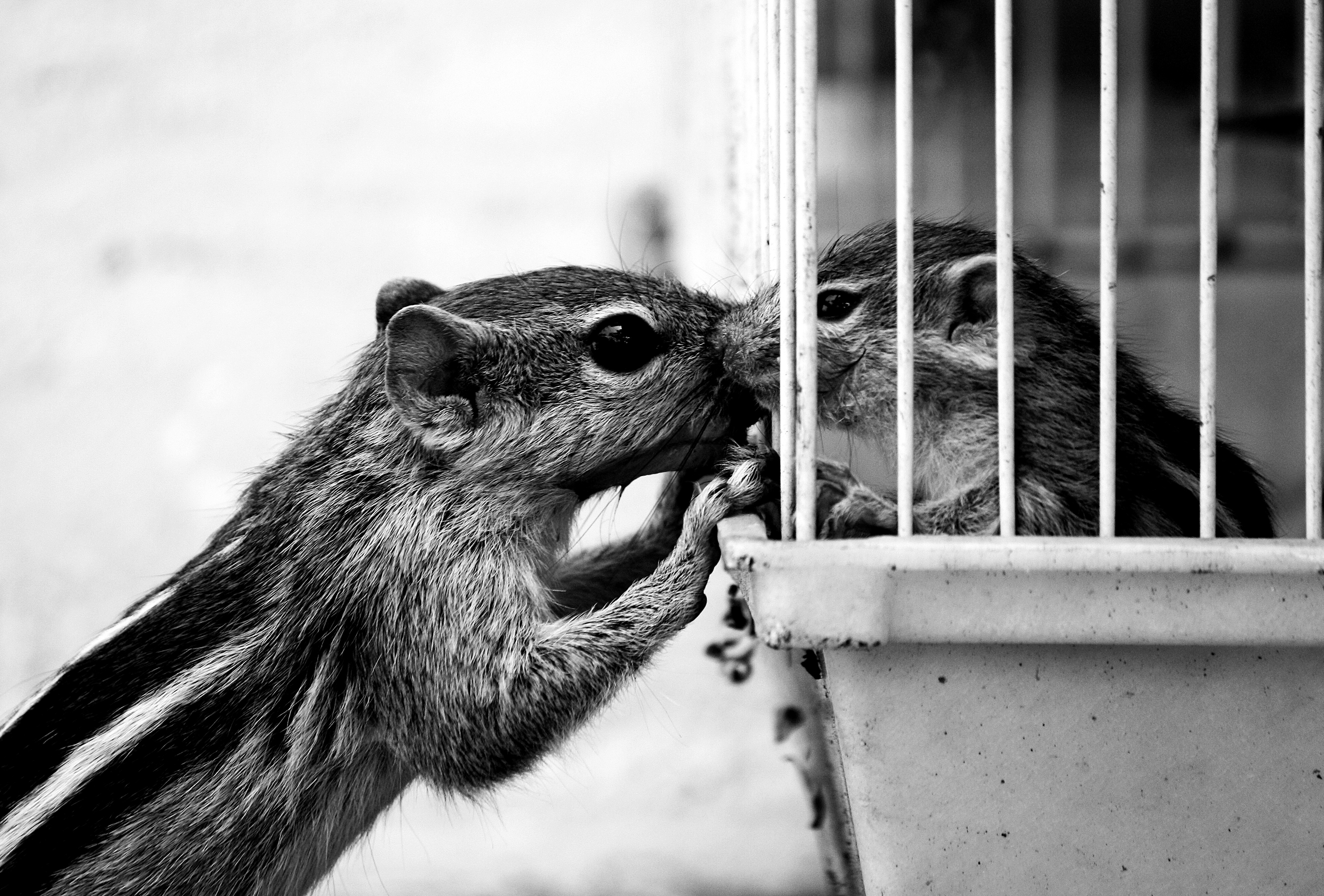
A squirrel communicating with its pup

Prior to the development of animal sciences such as comparative psychology and ethology, interpretation of animal behaviour tended to favour a minimalistic approach known as behaviourism. This approach refuses to ascribe to an animal a capability beyond the least demanding that would explain a behaviour; anything more than this is seen as unwarranted anthropomorphism. The behaviourist argument is, why should humans postulate consciousness and all its near-human implications in animals to explain some behaviour, if mere stimulus-response is a sufficient explanation to produce the same effects?

Some behaviourists, such as John B. Watson, claim that stimulus–response models provide a sufficient explanation for animal behaviours that have been described as emotional, and that all behaviour, no matter how complex, can be reduced to a simple stimulus-response association. Watson described that the purpose of psychology was "to predict, given the stimulus, what reaction will take place; or given the reaction, state what the situation or stimulus is that has caused the reaction".

The cautious wording of Dixon exemplifies this viewpoint:

Recent work in the area of ethics and animals suggests that it is philosophically legitimate to ascribe emotions to animals. Furthermore, it is sometimes argued that emotionality is a morally relevant psychological state shared by humans and non-humans. What is missing from the philosophical literature that makes reference to emotions in animals is an attempt to clarify and defend some particular account of the nature of emotion, and the role that emotions play in a characterization of human nature. I argue in this paper that some analyses of emotion are more credible than others. Because this is so, the thesis that humans and nonhumans share emotions may well be a more difficult case to make than has been recognized thus far.

Moussaieff Masson and McCarthy describe a similar view (with which they disagree):

While the study of emotion is a respectable field, those who work in it are usually academic psychologists who confine their studies to human emotions. The standard reference work, The Oxford Companion to Animal Behaviour, advises animal behaviourists that "One is well advised to study the behaviour, rather than attempting to get at any underlying emotion. There is considerable uncertainty and difficulty related to the interpretation and ambiguity of emotion: an animal may make certain movements and sounds, and show certain brain and chemical signals when its body is damaged in a particular way. But does this mean an animal feels—is aware of—pain as we are, or does it merely mean it is programmed to act a certain way with certain stimuli? Similar questions can be asked of any activity an animal (including a human) might undertake, in principle. Many scientists regard all emotion and cognition (in humans and animals) as having a purely mechanistic basis.

Because of the philosophical questions of consciousness and mind that are involved, many scientists have stayed away from examining animal and human emotion, and have instead studied measurable brain functions through neuroscience.

=== Comparative approach ===
In 1903, C. Lloyd Morgan published Morgan's Canon, a specialised form of Occam's razor used in ethology, in which he stated:

In no case is an animal activity to be interpreted in terms of higher psychological processes,
if it can be fairly interpreted in terms of processes which stand lower in the scale of psychological evolution and development.

=== Darwin's approach ===
Charles Darwin initially planned to include a chapter on emotion in The Descent of Man but as his ideas progressed they expanded into a book, The Expression of the Emotions in Man and Animals. Darwin proposed that emotions are adaptive and serve a communicative and motivational function, and he stated three principles that are useful in understanding emotional expression: First, The Principle of Serviceable Habits takes a Lamarckian stance by suggesting that emotional expressions that are useful will be passed on to the offspring. Second, The Principle of Antithesis suggests that some expressions exist merely because they oppose an expression that is useful. Third, The Principle of the Direct Action of the Excited Nervous System on the Body suggests that emotional expression occurs when nervous energy has passed a threshold and needs to be released.

Darwin saw emotional expression as an outward communication of an inner state, and the form of that expression often carries beyond its original adaptive use. For example, Darwin remarks that humans often present their canine teeth when sneering in rage, and he suggests that this means that a human ancestor probably utilized their teeth in aggressive action. A domestic dog's simple tail wag may be used in subtly different ways to convey many meanings as illustrated in Darwin's The Expression of the Emotions in Man and Animals published in 1872.

Examples of tail position indicating different emotions in dogs

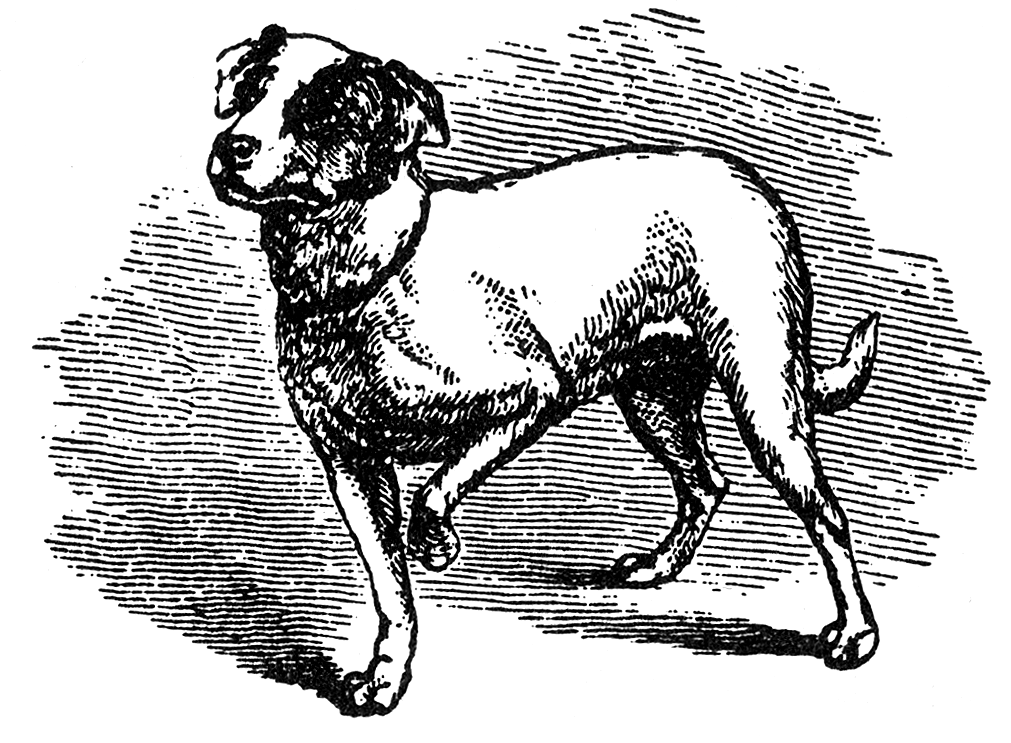
"Small dog watching a cat on a table"

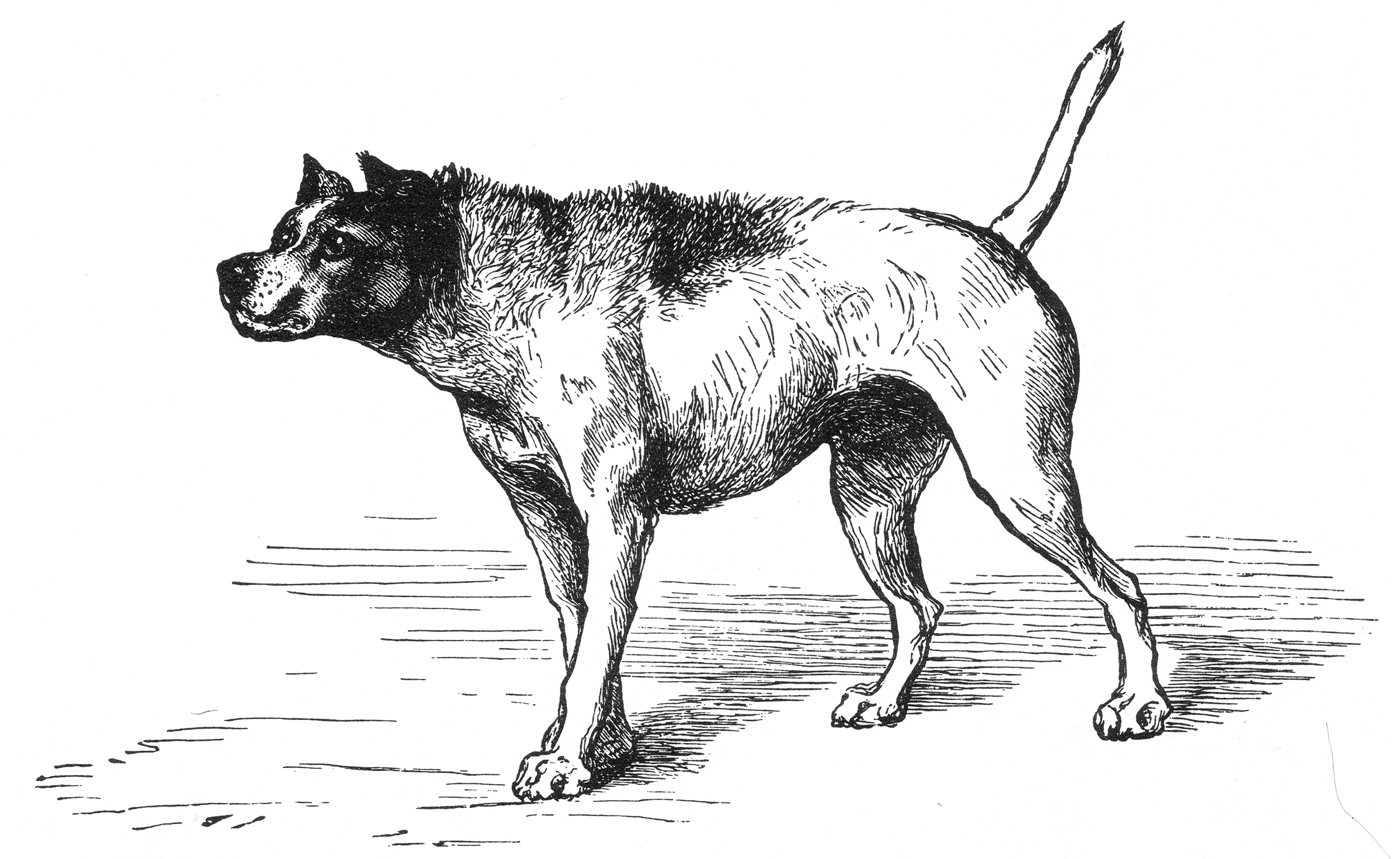
"Dog approaching another dog with hostile intentions"

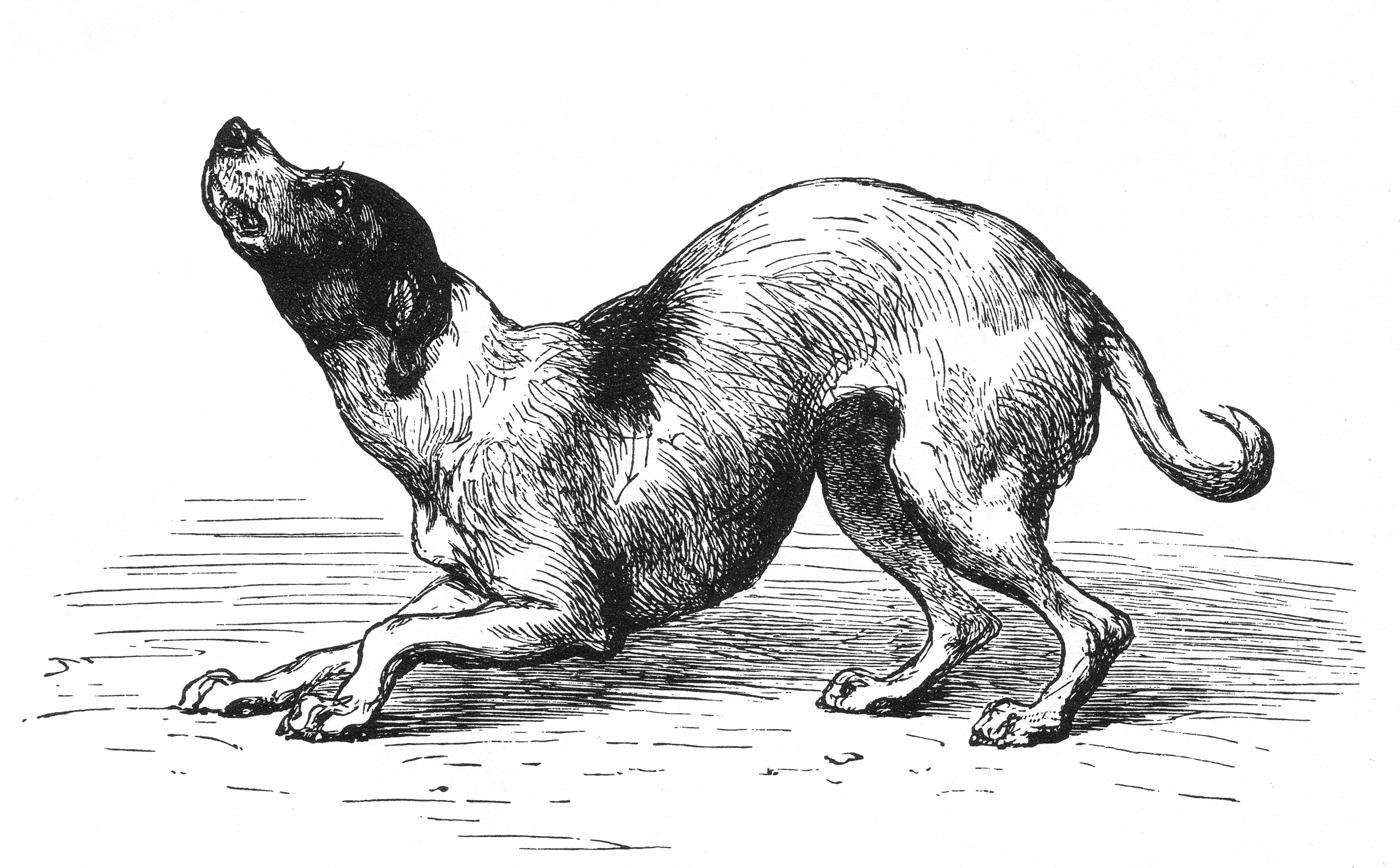
"Dog in a humble and affectionate frame of mind"

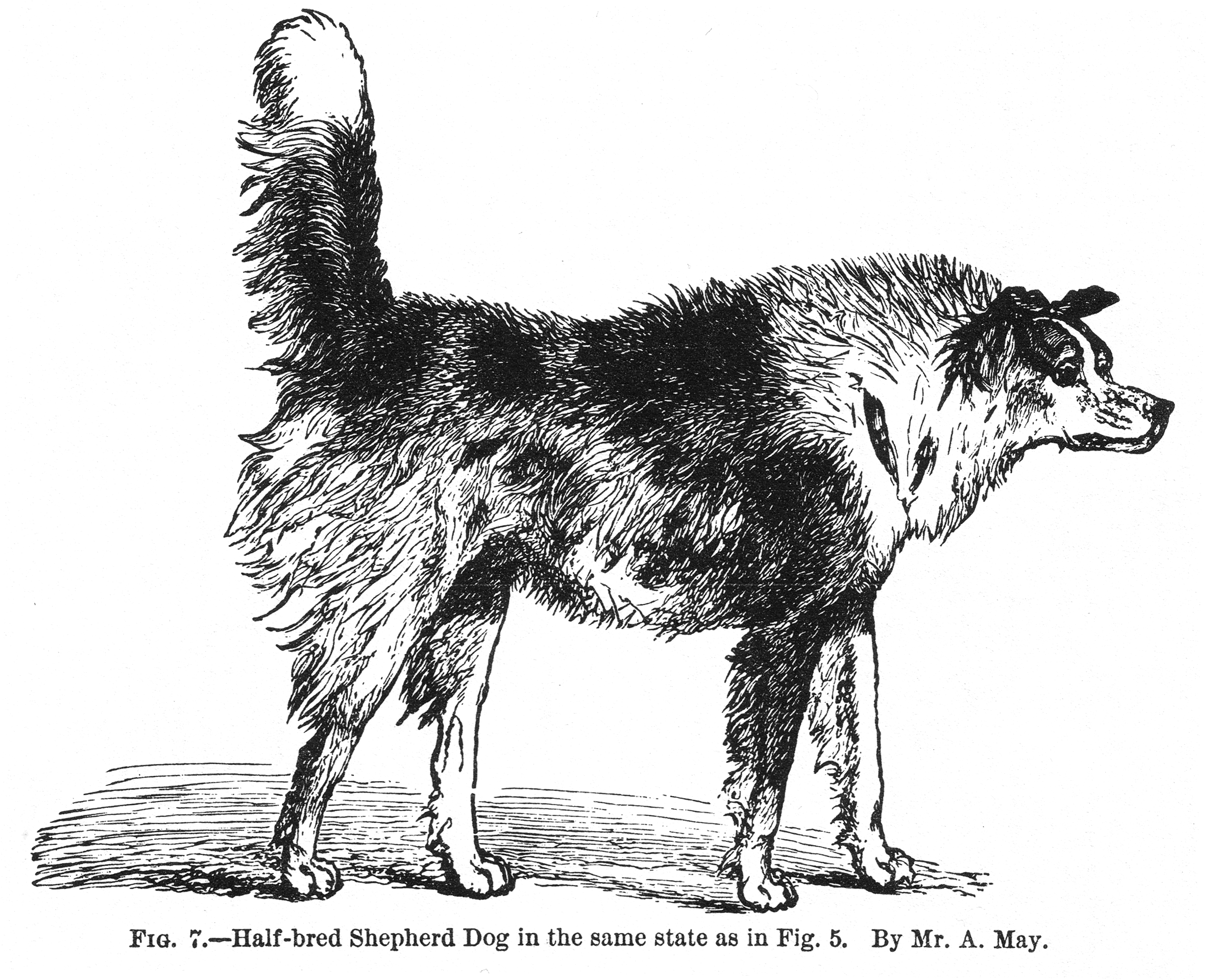
"Half-bred shepherd dog"

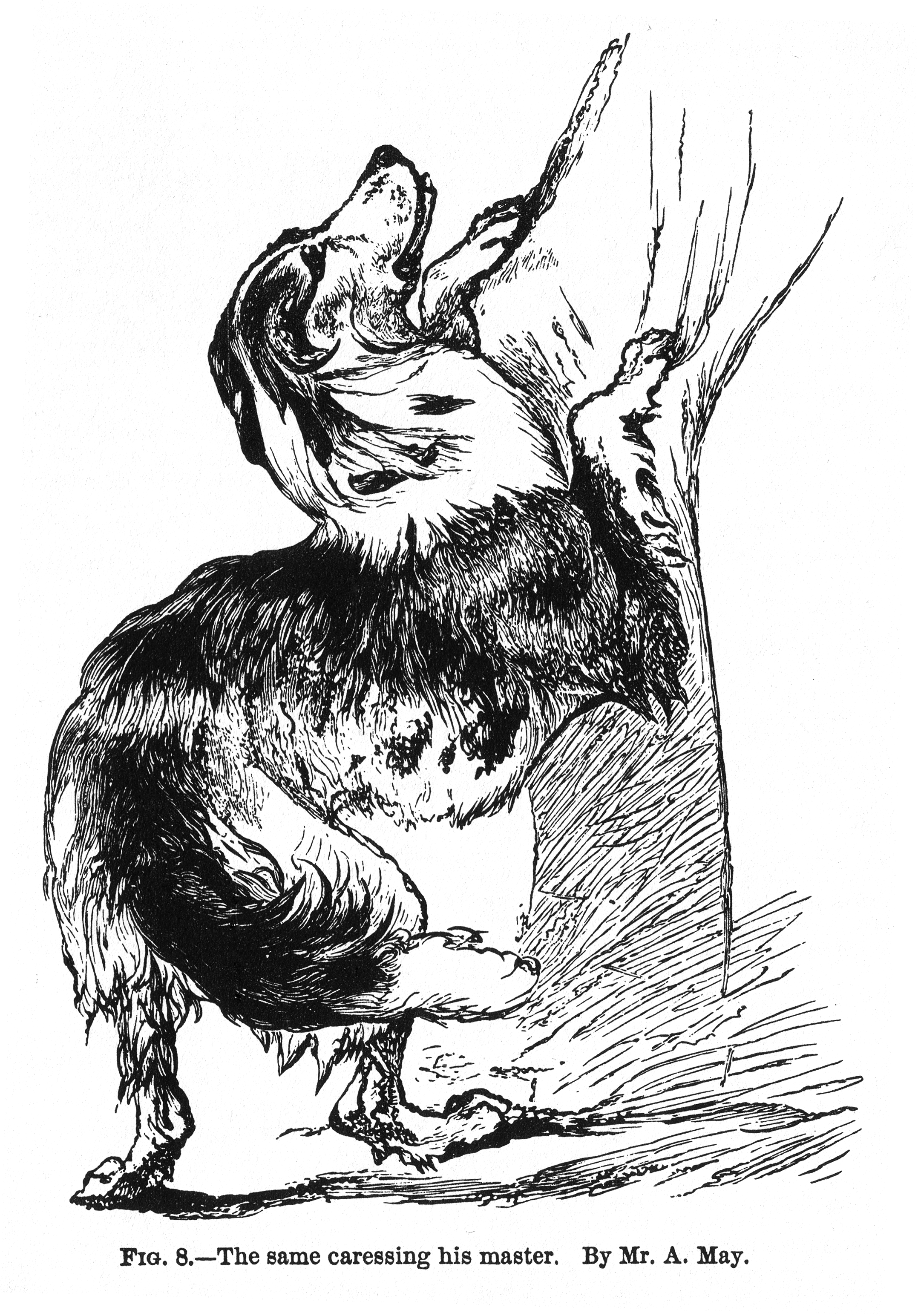
"Dog caressing his master"

=== Anecdotal approach ===
Evidence for emotions in animals has been primarily anecdotal, from individuals who interact with pets or captive animals on a regular basis. However, critics of animals having emotions often suggest that anthropomorphism is a motivating factor in the interpretation of the observed behaviours. Much of the debate is caused by the difficulty in defining emotions and the cognitive requirements thought necessary for animals to experience emotions in a similar way to humans. The problem is made more problematic by the difficulties in testing for emotions in animals. What is known about human emotion is almost all related or in relation to human communication.

=== Scientific approach ===
In recent years, the scientific community has become increasingly supportive of the idea of emotions in animals. Scientific research has provided insight into similarities of physiological changes between humans and animals when experiencing emotion.

Much support for animal emotion and its expression results from the notion that feeling emotions does not require significant cognitive processes, rather, they could be motivated by the processes to act in an adaptive way, as suggested by Darwin. Recent attempts in studying emotions in animals have led to new constructions in experimental and information gathering. Professor Marian Dawkins suggested that emotions could be studied on a functional or a mechanistic basis. Dawkins suggests that merely mechanistic or functional research will provide the answer on its own, but suggests that a mixture of the two would yield the most significant results.

==== Functional ====
Functional approaches rely on understanding what roles emotions play in humans and examining that role in animals. A widely used framework for viewing emotions in a functional context is that described by Oatley and Jenkins who see emotions as having three stages: (i) appraisal in which there is a conscious or unconscious evaluation of an event as relevant to a particular goal. An emotion is positive when that goal is advanced and negative when it is impeded (ii) action readiness where the emotion gives priority to one or a few kinds of action and may give urgency to one so that it can interrupt or compete with others and (iii) physiological changes, facial expression and then behavioural action. The structure, however, may be too broad and could be used to include all the animal kingdom as well as some plants.

==== Mechanistic ====
The second approach, mechanistic, requires an examination of the mechanisms that drive emotions and search for similarities in animals.

The mechanistic approach is utilized extensively by Paul, Harding and Mendl. Recognizing the difficulty in studying emotion in non-verbal animals, Paul et al. demonstrate possible ways to better examine this. Observing the mechanisms that function in human emotion expression, Paul et al. suggest that concentration on similar mechanisms in animals can provide clear insights into the animal experience. They noted that in humans, cognitive biases vary according to emotional state and suggested this as a possible starting point to examine animal emotion. They propose that researchers may be able to use controlled stimuli which have a particular meaning to trained animals to induce particular emotions in these animals and assess which types of basic emotions animals can experience.

==== Cognitive bias test ====
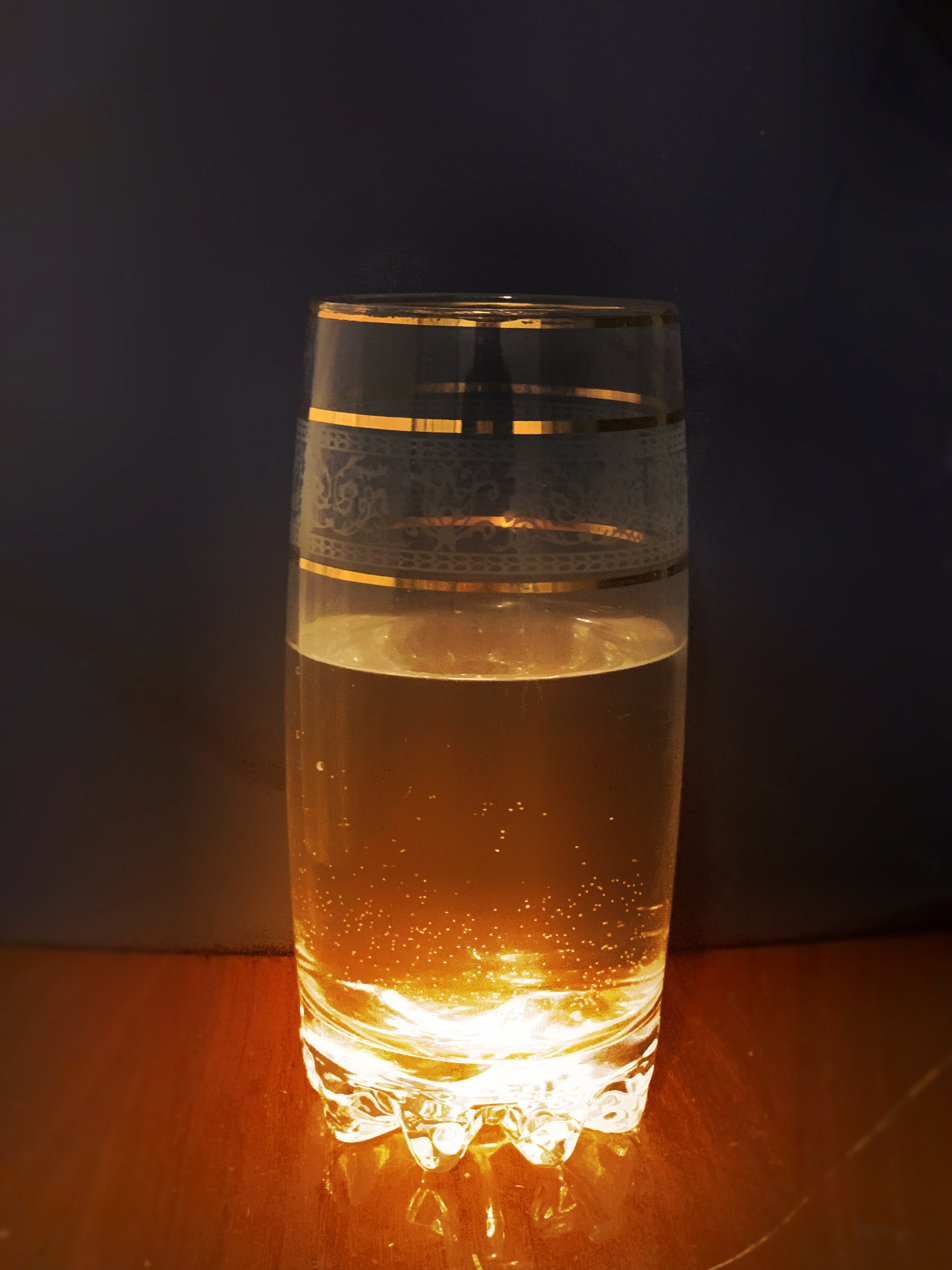
Is the glass half empty or half full?

A cognitive bias is a pattern of deviation in judgment, whereby inferences about other animals and situations may be drawn in an illogical fashion. Individuals create their own "subjective social reality" from their perception of the input. It refers to the question "Is the glass half empty or half full?", used as an indicator of optimism or pessimism. To test this in animals, an individual is trained to anticipate that stimulus A, e.g. a 20 Hz tone, precedes a positive event, e.g. highly desired food is delivered when a lever is pressed by the animal. The same individual is trained to anticipate that stimulus B, e.g. a 10 Hz tone, precedes a negative event, e.g. bland food is delivered when the animal presses a lever. The animal is then tested by being played an intermediate stimulus C, e.g. a 15 Hz tone, and observing whether the animal presses the lever associated with the positive or negative reward, thereby indicating whether the animal is in a positive or negative mood. This might be influenced by, for example, the type of housing the animal is kept in.

Using this approach, it has been found that rats which are subjected to either handling or tickling showed different responses to the intermediate stimulus: rats exposed to tickling were more optimistic. The authors stated that they had demonstrated "for the first time a link between the directly measured positive affective state and decision making under uncertainty in an animal model".

Cognitive biases have been shown in a wide range of species including rats, dogs, rhesus macaques, sheep, chicks, starlings and honeybees.

==== Self-medication with psychoactive drugs ====
Humans can have a range of emotional or mood disorders such as depression, anxiety, fear and panic. To treat these disorders, scientists have developed a range of psychoactive drugs such as anxiolytics. Many of these drugs are developed and tested by using a range of laboratory species. It is inconsistent to argue that these drugs are effective in treating human emotions whilst denying the experience of these emotions in the laboratory animals on which they have been developed and tested.

Standard laboratory cages prevent mice from performing several natural behaviours for which they are highly motivated. As a consequence, laboratory mice sometimes develop abnormal behaviours indicative of emotional disorders such as depression and anxiety. To improve welfare, these cages are sometimes enriched with items such as nesting material, shelters and running wheels. Sherwin and Ollson tested whether such enrichment influenced the consumption of Midazolam, a drug widely used to treat anxiety in humans. Mice in standard cages, standard cages but with unpredictable husbandry, or enriched cages, were given a choice of drinking either non-drugged water or a solution of the Midazolam. Mice in the standard and unpredictable cages drank a greater proportion of the anxiolytic solution than mice from enriched cages, indicating that mice from the standard and unpredictable laboratory caging may have been experiencing greater anxiety than mice from the enriched cages.

==== Spindle neurons ====
Spindle neurons are specialised cells found in three very restricted regions of the human brain – the anterior cingulate cortex, the frontoinsular cortex and the dorsolateral prefrontal cortex. The first two of these areas regulate emotional functions such as empathy, speech, intuition, rapid "gut reactions" and social organization in humans. Spindle neurons are also found in the brains of humpback whales, fin whales, killer whales, sperm whales, bottlenose dolphin, Risso's dolphin, beluga whales, and the African and Asian elephants.

Whales have spindle cells in greater numbers and are maintained for twice as long as humans. The exact function of spindle cells in whale brains is still not understood, but Hof and Van Der Gucht believe that they act as some sort of "high-speed connections that fast-track information to and from other parts of the cortex". They compared them to express trains that bypass unnecessary connections, enabling organisms to instantly process and act on emotional cues during complex social interactions. However, Hof and Van Der Gucht clarify that they do not know the nature of such feelings in these animals and that we cannot just apply what we see in great apes or ourselves to whales. They believe that more work is needed to know whether emotions are the same for humans and whales.

==== Vocalizations ====
Though non-human animals cannot provide useful verbal feedback about the experiential and cognitive details of their feelings, various emotional vocalizations of other animals may be indicators of potential affective states. Beginning with Darwin and his research, it has been known that chimpanzees and other great apes perform laugh-like vocalizations, providing scientists with more symbolic self-reports of their emotional experiences.

Research with rats has revealed that under particular conditions, they emit 50-kHz ultrasonic vocalisations (USV) which have been postulated to reflect a positive affective state (emotion) analogous to primitive human joy; these calls have been termed "laughter". The 50 kHz USVs in rats are uniquely elevated by hedonic stimuli—such as tickling, rewarding electrical brain stimulation, amphetamine injections, mating, play, and aggression—and are suppressed by aversive stimuli. Of all manipulations that elicit 50 kHz chirps in rats, tickling by humans elicits the highest rate of these calls.

Some vocalizations of domestic cats, such as purring, are well known to be produced in situations of positive valence, such as mother kitten interactions, contacts with familiar partner, or during tactile stimulation with inanimate objects as when rolling and rubbing. Therefore, purring can be generally considered as an indicator of "pleasure" in cats.

Low pitched bleating in sheep has been associated with some positive-valence situations, as they are produced by males as an estrus female is approaching or by lactating mothers while licking and nursing their lambs.

==== Neurological ====
Neuroscientific studies based on the instinctual, emotional action tendencies of non-human animals accompanied by the brains neurochemical and electrical changes are deemed to best monitor relative primary process emotional/affective states. Predictions based on the research conducted on animals is what leads analysis of the neural infrastructure relevant in humans. Psycho-neuro-ethological triangulation with both humans and animals allows for further experimentation into animal emotions. Utilizing specific animals that exhibit indicators of emotional states to decode underlying neural systems aids in the discovery of critical brain variables that regulate animal emotional expressions. Comparing the results of the animals converse experiments occur predicting the affective changes that should result in humans. Specific studies where there is an increase or decrease of playfulness or separation distress vocalizations in animals, comparing humans that exhibit the predicted increases or decreases in feelings of joy or sadness, the weight of evidence constructs a concrete neural hypothesis concerning the nature of affect supporting all relevant species.

== Criticism ==
The argument that animals experience emotions is sometimes rejected due to a lack of higher quality evidence, and those who do not believe in the idea of animal intelligence often argue that anthropomorphism plays a role in individuals' perspectives. Those who reject that animals have the capacity to experience emotion do so mainly by referring to inconsistencies in studies that have endorsed the belief emotions exist. Having no linguistic means to communicate emotion beyond behavioral response interpretation, the difficulty of providing an account of emotion in animals relies heavily on interpretive experimentation, that relies on results from human subjects.

While the existence of basic emotions such as fear in animals is rarely disputed, there is evidence that anthropomorphism may influence humans to believe animals they observe are expressing more complex emotions than they actually are. In a widely known experiment, dog owners instructed their animals not to eat a treat, and then left them with an experimenter. When they returned, the owners were given a random report about whether their dog had eaten the treat. Interestingly, over multiple trials, dog behavior was uncorrelated with whether they had eaten the treat or not. Rather, dog behavior was more likely to be interpreted as guilty in the case where they had not eaten the treat. Indeed, the strongest correlation with dog behavior related to whether the owner scolded the dog. Investigators considering the potential for anthropomorphism point out that misattributing complex emotions to animals risks resulting in unfair treatment.

Some people oppose the concept of animal emotions and suggest that emotions are not universal, including in humans. If emotions are not universal, this indicates that there is not a phylogenetic relationship between human and non-human emotion. The relationship drawn by proponents of animal emotion, then, would be merely a suggestion of mechanistic features that promote adaptivity, but lack the complexity of human emotional constructs. Thus, a social life-style may play a role in the process of basic emotions developing into more complex emotions.

Darwin concluded, through a survey, that humans share universal emotive expressions and suggested that animals likely share in these to some degree. Social constructionists disregard the concept that emotions are universal; others hold an intermediate stance, suggesting that basic emotional expressions and emotion are universal but the intricacies are developed culturally. A study by Elfenbein and Ambady indicated that individuals within a particular culture are better at recognising other cultural members' emotions.

== Examples ==
=== Primates ===
Primates, in particular non-human great apes, are candidates for being able to experience empathy and theory of mind. Great apes have complex social systems; young apes and their mothers have strong bonds of attachment and when a baby chimpanzee or gorilla dies, the mother will commonly carry the body around for several days. Jane Goodall has described chimpanzees as exhibiting mournful behavior. Koko, a gorilla trained to use sign language, was reported to have expressed vocalizations indicating sadness after the death of her pet cat, All Ball.

Beyond such anecdotal evidence, support for empathetic reactions has come from experimental studies of rhesus macaques. Macaques refused to pull a chain that delivered food to themselves if doing so also caused a companion to receive an electric shock. This inhibition of hurting another conspecific was more pronounced between familiar than unfamiliar macaques, a finding similar to that of empathy in humans.

Furthermore, there has been research on consolation behavior in chimpanzees. De Waal and Aureli found that third-party contacts attempt to relieve the distress of contact participants by consoling (e.g. making contact, embracing, grooming) recipients of aggression, especially those that have experienced more intense aggression. Researchers were unable to replicate these results using the same observation protocol in studies of monkeys, demonstrating a possible difference in empathy between apes and other monkeys.

Other studies have examined emotional processing in the great apes. Specifically, chimpanzees were shown video clips of emotionally charged scenes, such as a detested veterinary procedure or a favorite food, and then were required to match these scenes with one of two species-specific facial expressions: "happy" (a play-face) or "sad" (a teeth-baring expression seen in frustration or after defeat). The chimpanzees correctly matched the clips to the facial expressions that shared their meaning, demonstrating that they understand the emotional significance of their facial expressions. Measures of peripheral skin temperature also indicated that the video clips emotionally affected the chimpanzees.

=== Rodents ===
In 1998, Jaak Panksepp proposed that all mammalian species are equipped with brains capable of generating emotional experiences. Subsequent work examined studies on rodents to provide foundational support for this claim. One of these studies examined whether rats would work to alleviate the distress of a conspecific. Rats were trained to press a lever to avoid the delivery of an electric shock, signaled by a visual cue, to a conspecific. They were then tested in a situation in which either a conspecific or a Styrofoam block was hoisted into the air and could be lowered by pressing a lever. Rats that had previous experience with conspecific distress demonstrated greater than ten-fold more responses to lower a distressed conspecific compared to rats in the control group, while those who had never experienced conspecific distress expressed greater than three-fold more responses to lower a distressed conspecific relative to the control group. This suggests that rats will actively work to reduce the distress of a conspecific, a phenomenon related to empathy. Comparable results have also been found in similar experiments designed for monkeys.

Langford et al. examined empathy in rodents using an approach based in neuroscience. They reported that (1) if two mice experienced pain together, they expressed greater levels of pain-related behavior than if pain was experienced individually, (2) if experiencing different levels of pain together, the behavior of each mouse was modulated by the level of pain experienced by its social partner, and (3) sensitivity to a noxious stimulus was experienced to the same degree by the mouse observing a conspecific in pain as it was by the mouse directly experiencing the painful stimulus. The authors suggest this responsiveness to the pain of others demonstrated by mice is indicative of emotional contagion, a phenomenon associated with empathy, which has also been reported in pigs. One behaviour associated with fear in rats is freezing. If female rats experience electric shocks to the feet and then witness another rat experiencing similar footshocks, they freeze more than females without any experience of the shocks. This suggests empathy in experienced rats witnessing another individual being shocked. Furthermore, the demonstrator's behaviour was changed by the behaviour of the witness; demonstrators froze more following footshocks if their witness froze more creating an empathy loop.

Several studies have also shown rodents can respond to a conditioned stimulus that has been associated with the distress of a conspecific, as if it were paired with the direct experience of an unconditioned stimulus. These studies suggest that rodents are capable of shared affect, a concept critical to empathy.

=== Horses ===
Although not direct evidence that horses experience emotions, a 2016 study showed that domestic horses react differently to seeing photographs of positive (happy) or negative (angry) human facial expressions. When viewing angry faces, horses look more with their left eye which is associated with perceiving negative stimuli. Their heart rate also increases more quickly and they show more stress-related behaviours. One rider wrote, 'Experienced riders and trainers can learn to read the subtle moods of individual horses according to wisdom passed down from one horseman to the next, but also from years of trial-and-error. I suffered many bruised toes and nipped fingers before I could detect a curious swivel of the ears, irritated flick of the tail, or concerned crinkle above a long-lashed eye.' This suggests that horses have emotions and display them physically but is not concrete evidence.

=== Birds ===
Marc Bekoff reported accounts of animal behaviour which he believed was evidence of animals being able to experience emotions in his book The Emotional Lives of Animals. The following is an excerpt from his book:

A few years ago my friend Rod and I were riding our bicycles around Boulder, Colorado, when we witnessed a very interesting encounter among five magpies. Magpies are corvids, a very intelligent family of birds. One magpie had obviously been hit by a car and was laying dead on the side of the road. The four other magpies were standing around him. One approached the corpse, gently pecked at it-just as an elephant noses the carcass of another elephant- and stepped back. Another magpie did the same thing. Next, one of the magpies flew off, brought back some grass, and laid it by the corpse. Another magpie did the same. Then, all four magpies stood vigil for a few seconds and one by one flew off.

Bystander affiliation is believed to represent an expression of empathy in which the bystander tries to console a conflict victim and alleviate their distress. There is evidence for bystander affiliation in ravens (e.g. contact sitting, preening, or beak-to-beak or beak-to-body touching) and also for solicited bystander affiliation, in which there is post-conflict affiliation from the victim to the bystander. This indicates that ravens may be sensitive to the emotions of others, however, relationship value plays an important role in the prevalence and function of these post-conflict interactions.

The capacity of domestic hens to experience empathy has been studied. Mother hens show one of the essential underpinning attributes of empathy: the ability to be affected by, and share, the emotional state of their distressed chicks. However, evidence for empathy between familiar adult hens has not yet been found.

=== Dogs ===
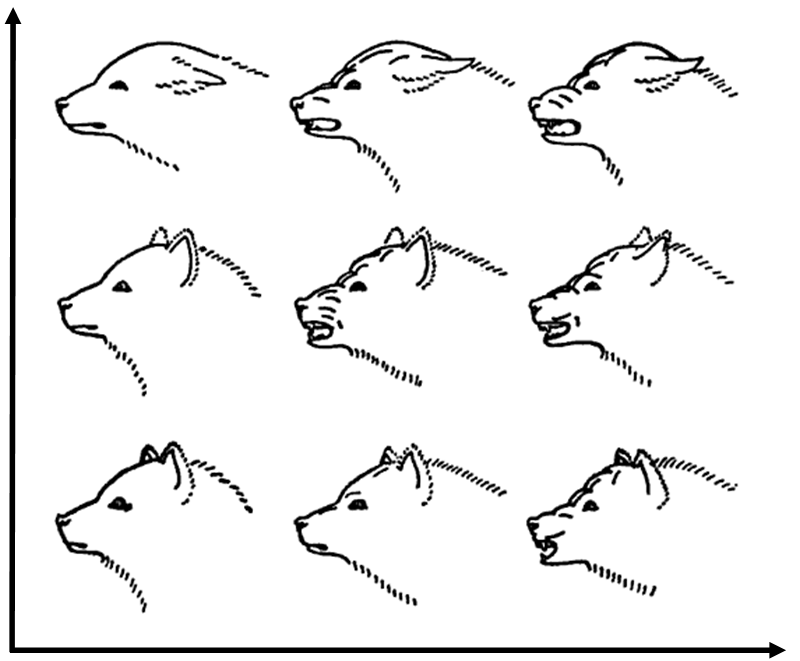
A drawing by Konrad Lorenz showing facial expressions of a dog

Some research indicates that domestic dogs may experience negative emotions in a similar manner to humans, including the equivalent of certain chronic and acute psychological conditions. Much of this is from studies by Martin Seligman on the theory of learned helplessness as an extension of his interest in depression:

A dog that had earlier been repeatedly conditioned to associate an audible stimulus with inescapable electric shocks did not subsequently try to escape the electric shocks after the warning was presented, even though all the dog would have had to do is jump over a low divider within ten seconds. The dog didn't even try to avoid the "aversive stimulus"; it had previously "learned" that nothing it did would reduce the probability of it receiving a shock. A follow-up experiment involved three dogs affixed in harnesses, including one that received shocks of identical intensity and duration to the others, but the lever which would otherwise have allowed the dog a degree of control was left disconnected and didn't do anything. The first two dogs quickly recovered from the experience, but the third dog suffered chronic symptoms of clinical depression as a result of this perceived helplessness.

A further series of experiments showed that, similar to humans, under conditions of long-term intense psychological stress, around one third of dogs do not develop learned helplessness or long-term depression. Instead these animals somehow managed to find a way to handle the unpleasant situation in spite of their past experience. The corresponding characteristic in humans has been found to correlate highly with an explanatory style and optimistic attitude that views the situation as other than personal, pervasive, or permanent.

Since these studies, symptoms analogous to clinical depression, neurosis, and other psychological conditions have also been accepted as being within the scope of emotion in domestic dogs. The postures of dogs may indicate their emotional state.

Psychology research has shown that when humans gaze at the face of another human, the gaze is not symmetrical; the gaze instinctively moves to the right side of the face to obtain information about their emotions and state. Research at the University of Lincoln shows that dogs share this instinct when meeting a human, and only when meeting a human (i.e. not other animals or other dogs). They are the only non-primate species known to share this instinct.

The existence and nature of personality traits in dogs have been studied (15,329 dogs of 164 different breeds). Five consistent and stable "narrow traits" were identified, described as playfulness, curiosity/fearlessness, chase-proneness, sociability and aggressiveness. A further higher order axis for shyness–boldness was also identified.

Dogs presented with images of either human or dog faces with different emotional states (happy/playful or angry/aggressive) paired with a single vocalization (voices or barks) from the same individual with either a positive or negative emotional state or brown noise. Dogs look longer at the face whose expression is congruent to the emotional state of the vocalization, for both other dogs and humans. This is an ability previously known only in humans. The behavior of a dog can not always be an indication of its friendliness. This is because when a dog wags its tail, most people interpret this as the dog expressing happiness and friendliness. Though indeed tail wagging can express these positive emotions, tail wagging is also an indication of fear, insecurity, challenging of dominance, establishing social relationships or a warning that the dog may bite.

Some researchers are beginning to investigate the question of whether dogs have emotions with the help of magnetic resonance imaging.

=== Elephants ===
Elephants are known for their empathy towards members of the same species as well as their cognitive memory. While this is true scientists continuously debate the extent to which elephants feel emotion. Observations show that elephants, like humans, are concerned with distressed or deceased individuals, and render assistance to the ailing and show a special interest in dead bodies of their own kind, however this view is interpreted by some as being anthropomorphic.

Elephants have recently been suggested to pass mirror self-recognition tests, and such tests have been linked to the capacity for empathy. However, the experiment showing such actions did not follow the accepted protocol for tests of self-recognition, and earlier attempts to show mirror self-recognition in elephants have failed, so this remains a contentious claim.

Elephants are also deemed to show emotion through vocal expression, specifically the rumble vocalization. Rumbles are frequency modulated, harmonically rich calls with fundamental frequencies in the infrasonic range, with clear formant structure. Elephants exhibit negative emotion and/or increased emotional intensity through their rumbles, based on specific periods of social interaction and agitation.

=== Cats ===
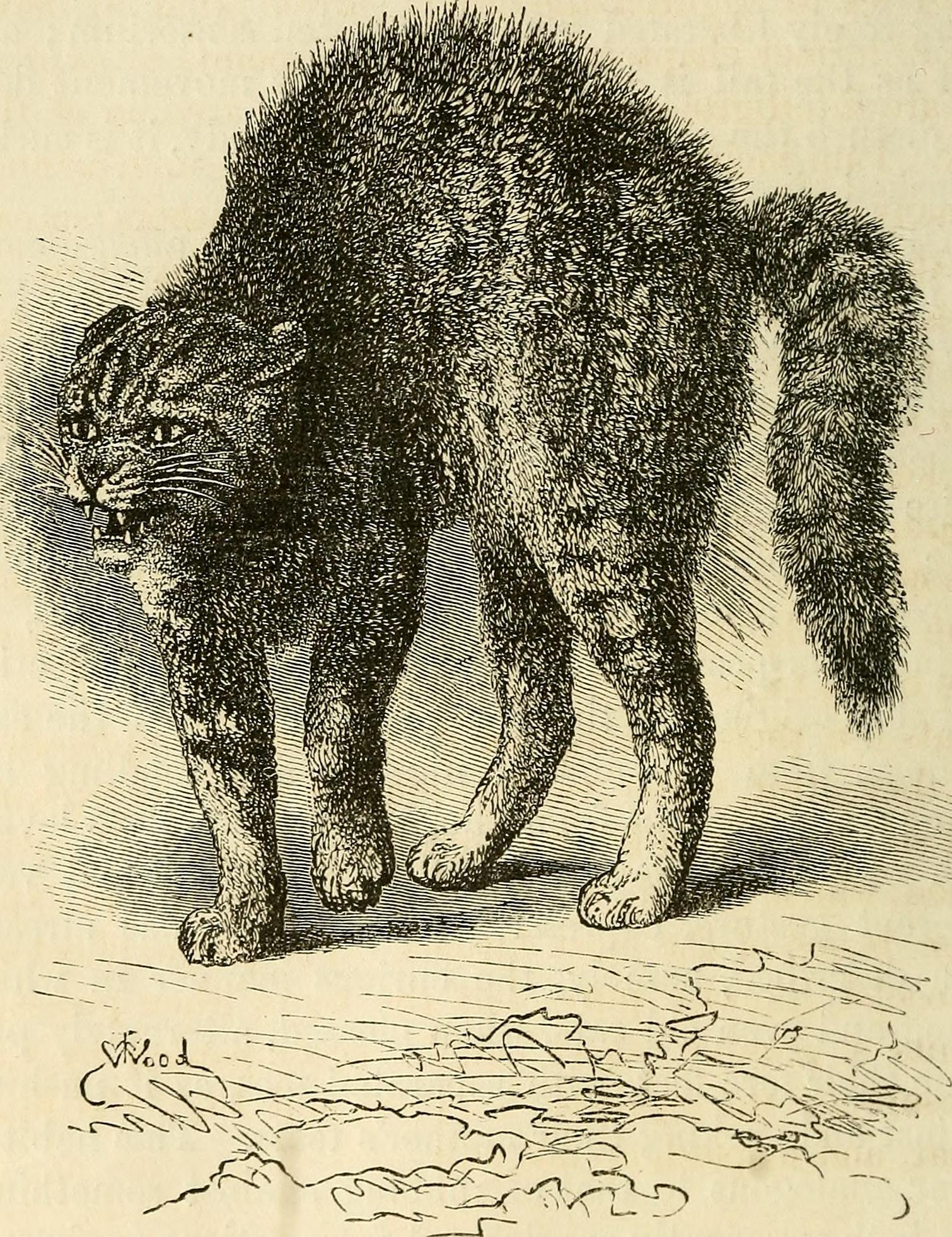
Cat's response to a fear inducing stimulus.

It has been postulated that domestic cats can learn to manipulate their owners through vocalizations that are similar to the cries of human babies. Some cats learn to add a purr to the vocalization, which makes it less harmonious and more dissonant to humans, and therefore harder to ignore. Individual cats learn to make these vocalizations through trial-and-error; when a particular vocalization elicits a positive response from a human, the probability increases that the cat will use that vocalization in the future.

Growling can be an expression of annoyance or fear, similar to humans. When annoyed or angry, a cat wriggles and thumps its tail much more vigorously than when in a contented state. In larger felids such as lions, what appears to be irritating to them varies between individuals. A male lion may let his cubs play with his mane or tail, or he may hiss and hit them with his paws. Domestic male cats also have variable attitudes towards their family members, for example, older male siblings tend not to go near younger or new siblings and may even show hostility toward them.

Hissing is also a vocalization associated with either offensive or defensive aggression. They are usually accompanied by a postural display intended to have a visual effect on the perceived threat. Cats hiss when they are startled, scared, angry, or in pain, and also to scare off intruders into their territory. If the hiss and growl warning does not remove the threat, an attack by the cat may follow. Kittens as young as two to three weeks will potentially hiss when first picked up by a human.

=== Honeybees ===
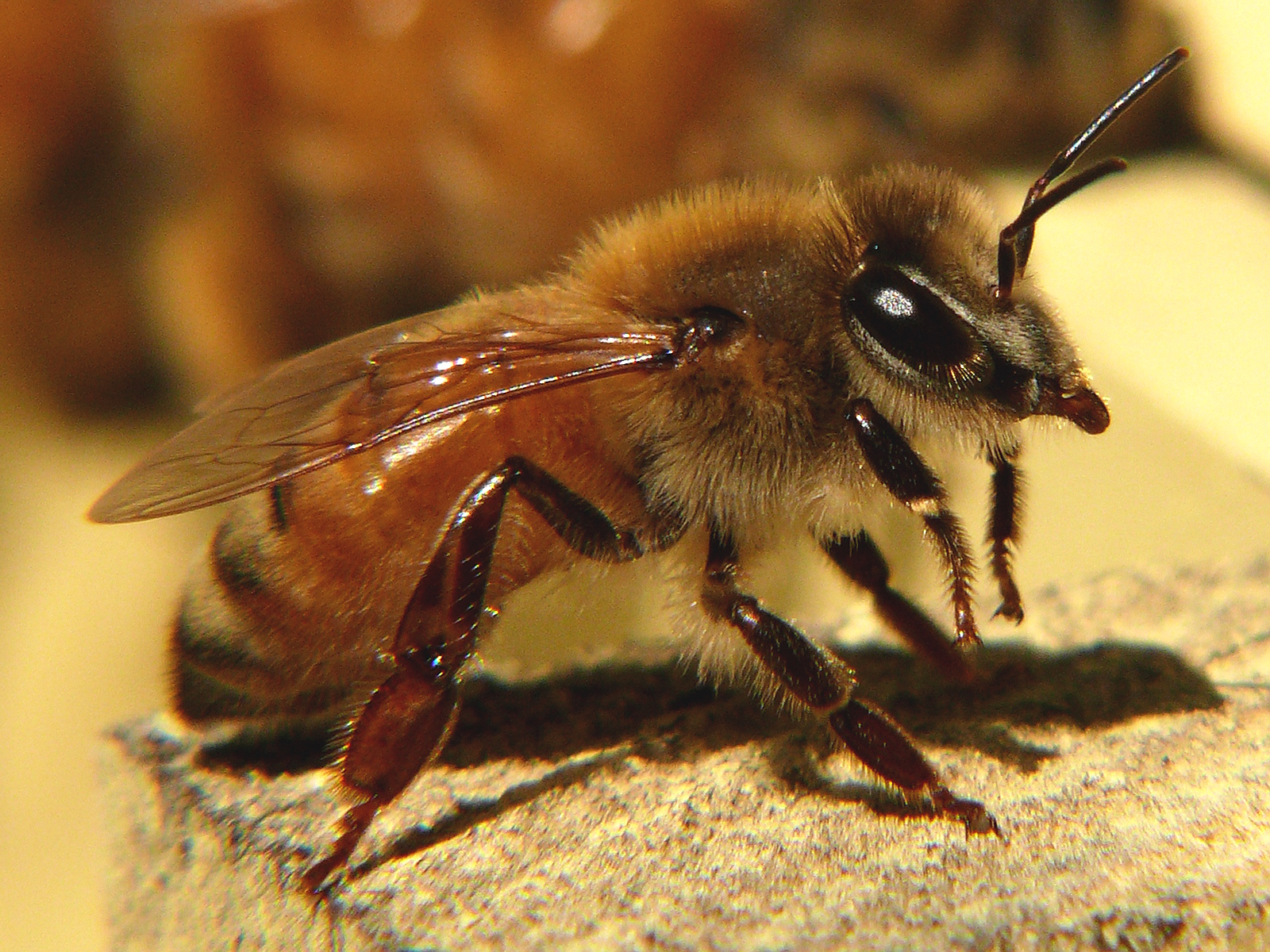
Honeybees become pessimistic after being shaken

Honeybees ("Apis mellifera carnica") were trained to extend their proboscis to a two-component odour mixture (CS+) predicting a reward (e.g., 1.00 or 2.00 M sucrose) and to withhold their proboscis from another mixture (CS−) predicting either punishment or a less valuable reward (e.g., 0.01 M quinine solution or 0.3 M sucrose). Immediately after training, half of the honeybees were subjected to vigorous shaking for 60 s to simulate the state produced by a predatory attack on a concealed colony. This shaking reduced levels of octopamine, dopamine, and serotonin in the hemolymph of a separate group of honeybees at a time point corresponding to when the cognitive bias tests were performed. In honeybees, octopamine is the local neurotransmitter that functions during reward learning, whereas dopamine mediates the ability to learn to associate odours with quinine punishment. If flies are fed serotonin, they are more aggressive; flies depleted of serotonin still exhibit aggression, but they do so much less frequently.

Within 5 minutes of the shaking, all the trained bees began a sequence of unreinforced test trials with five odour stimuli presented in a random order for each bee: the CS+, the CS−, and three novel odours composed of ratios intermediate between the two learned mixtures. Shaken honeybees were more likely to withhold their mouthparts from the CS− and from the most similar novel odour. Therefore, agitated honeybees display an increased expectation of bad outcomes similar to a vertebrate-like emotional state. The researchers of the study stated that, "Although our results do not allow us to make any claims about the presence of negative subjective feelings in honeybees, they call into question how we identify emotions in any non-human animal. It is logically inconsistent to claim that the presence of pessimistic cognitive biases should be taken as confirmation that dogs or rats are anxious but to deny the same conclusion in the case of honeybees."

=== Crayfish ===
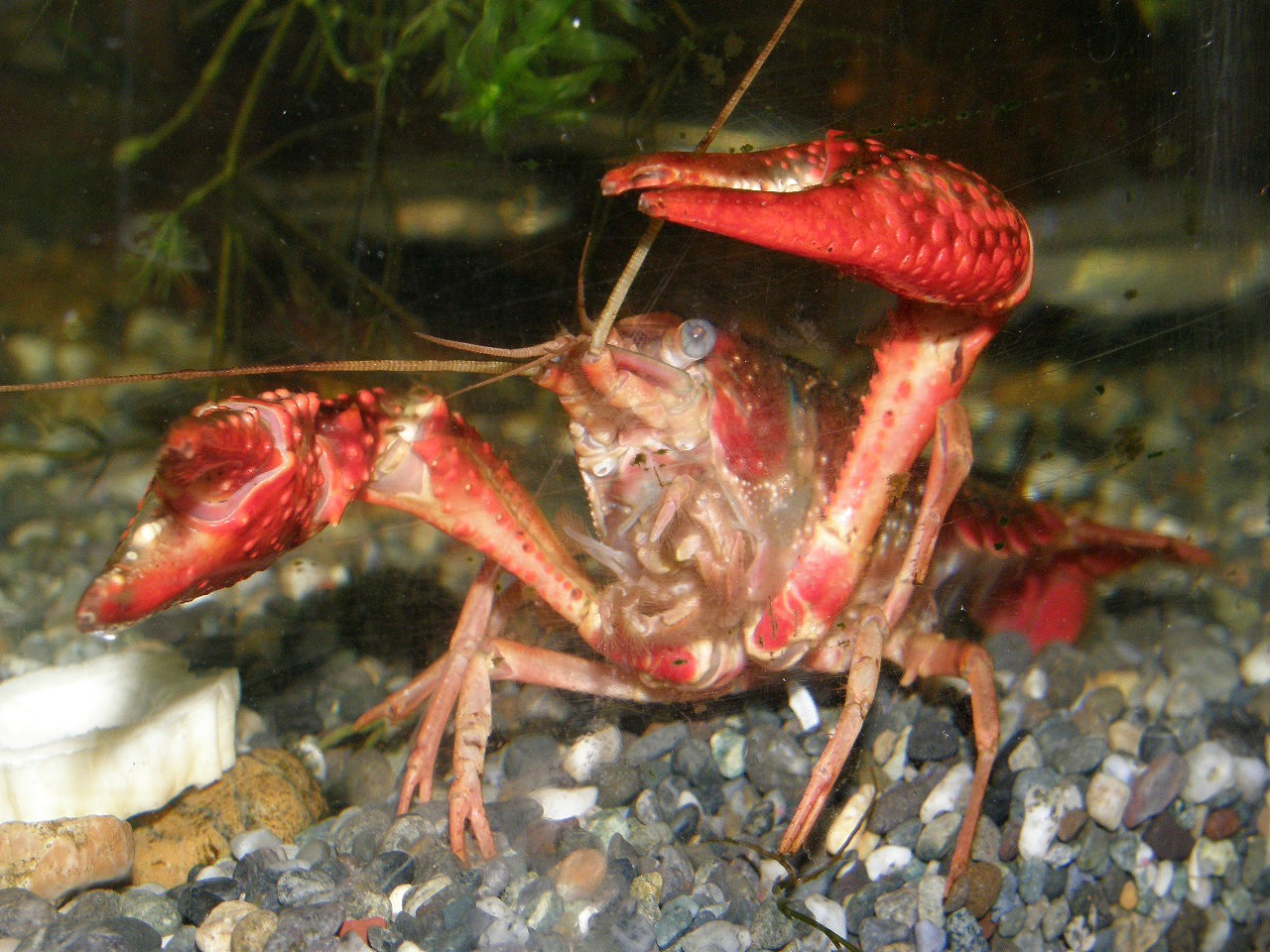
The freshwater crayfish Procambarus clarkii

Crayfish naturally explore new environments but display a general preference for dark places. A 2014 study on the freshwater crayfish Procambarus clarkii tested their responses in a fear paradigm, the elevated plus maze in which animals choose to walk on an elevated cross which offers both aversive and preferable conditions (in this case, two arms were lit and two were dark). Crayfish which experienced an electric shock displayed enhanced fearfulness or anxiety as demonstrated by their preference for the dark arms more than the light. Furthermore, shocked crayfish had relatively higher brain serotonin concentrations coupled with elevated blood glucose, which indicates a stress response. Moreover, the crayfish calmed down when they were injected with the benzodiazepine anxiolytic, chlordiazepoxide, used to treat anxiety in humans, and they entered the dark as normal. The authors of the study concluded "[...] stress-induced avoidance behavior in crayfish exhibits striking homologies with vertebrate anxiety."

A follow-up study using the same species confirmed the anxiolytic effect of chlordiazepoxide, but moreover, the intensity of the anxiety-like behaviour was dependent on the intensity of the electric shock until reaching a plateau. Such a quantitative relationship between stress and anxiety is also a very common feature of human and vertebrate anxiety.

== See also ==
- Altruism in animals
- Animal cognition
- Animal communication
- Animal consciousness
- Animal faith
- Animal sexual behaviour § Sex for pleasure
- Empathy § In animals
- Evolution of emotion
- Fear § In animals
- Monkey painting
- Neuroethology
- Pain in animals
- Reward system § Animals vs. humans
- Self-awareness § In animals
- "What Is It Like to Be a Bat?"
