= Jaak Panksepp =

American neuroscientist (1943–2017)

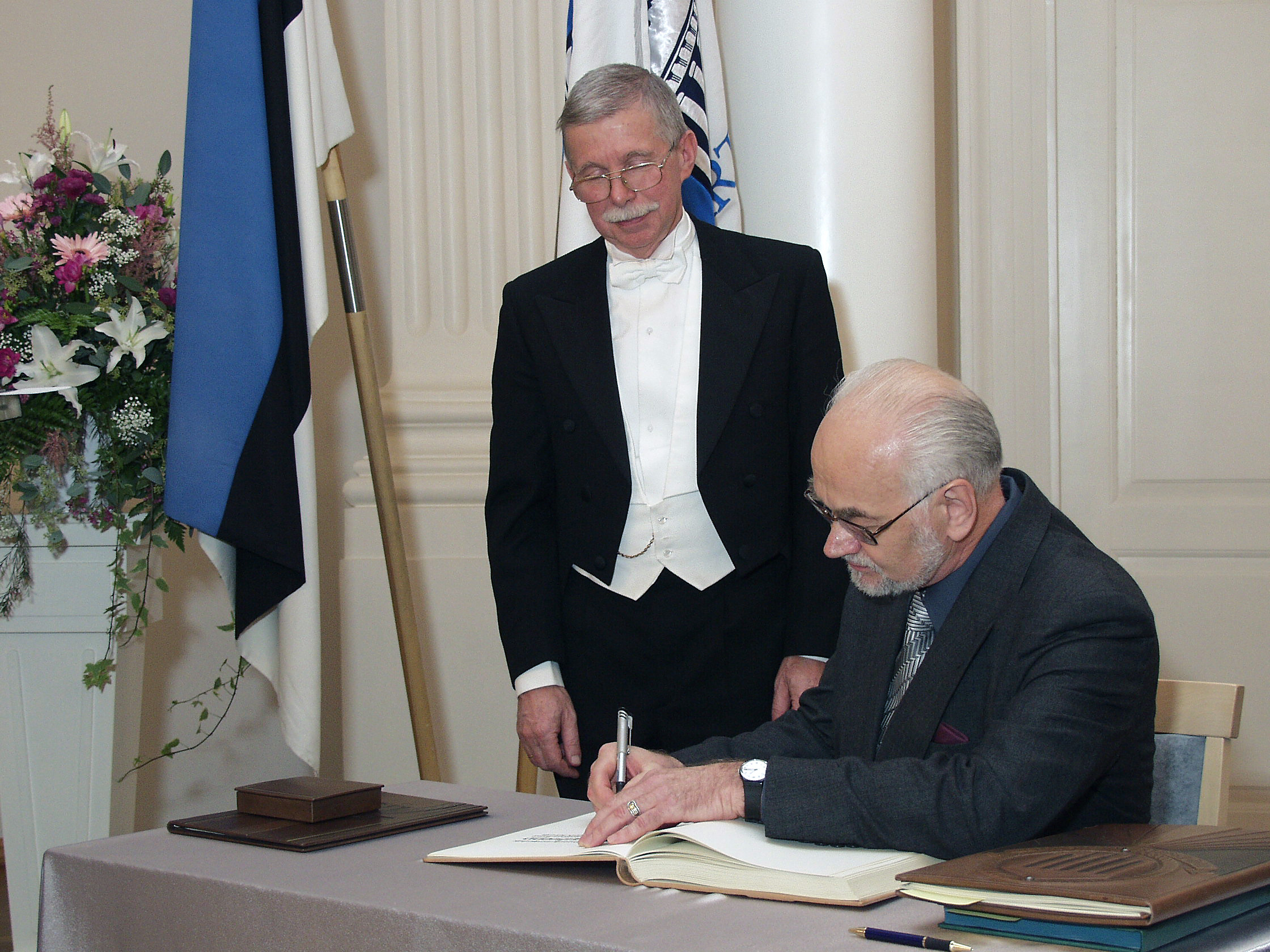
- Jaak Panksepp (on the right) at the promotion of honorary doctors at the University of Tartu (December 2004).
- Born: June 5, 1943; Tartu, Estonia
- Died: April 18, 2017 (aged 73); Bowling Green, Ohio, U.S.
- Education: University of Pittsburgh (BS, 1965); University of Massachusetts, Amherst (MS, 1967) (PhD, 1969)
- Known for: Pioneer in affective neuroscience
- Awards: Order of the White Star
- Scientific career
- Fields: Psychology, Neuropsychopharmacology, Affective neuroscience, Behavioral neuroscience
- Workplaces: University of Sussex; Worcester Foundation for Biomedical Research; Bowling Green State University; University of Toledo College of Medicine and Life Sciences; Washington State University; Northwestern University

Jaak Panksepp (June 5, 1943 – April 18, 2017) was an Estonian-American neuroscientist and psychobiologist who coined the term "affective neuroscience", the name for the field that studies the neural mechanisms of emotion. He was the Baily Endowed Chair of Animal Well-Being Science for the Department of Veterinary and Comparative Anatomy, Pharmacology, and Physiology at Washington State University's College of Veterinary Medicine, and Emeritus Professor of the Department of Psychology at Bowling Green State University. He was known in the popular press for his research on laughter in non-human animals.

== Early life and education ==
Panksepp was born in Tartu, Estonia on June 5, 1943. His family escaped the ravages of post-WWII Soviet occupation by moving to the United States when he was very young. He initially studied at University of Pittsburgh in 1964, and then completed a Ph.D. at the University of Massachusetts.

== Research ==
Panksepp resisted establishment forces in animal research, the most notably B. F. Skinner’s school of behaviorism which held that human emotions are irrelevant and animal emotions suspect. He was ridiculed for wanting to study the neuroscience of affect, and he struggled to find research funding. Panksepp conducted many experiments; in one with rats, he found that the rats showed signs of fear when cat hair was placed close to them, even though they had never been anywhere near a cat. Panksepp theorized from this experiment that it is possible laboratory research could routinely be skewed due to researchers with pet cats. He attempted to replicate the experiment using dog hair, but the rats displayed no signs of fear.

Panksepp is also well known for publishing a paper in 1979 suggesting that opioid peptides could play a role in the etiology of autism, which proposed that autism may be "an emotional disturbance arising from an upset in the opiate systems in the brain".

In the 1999 documentary Why Dogs Smile and Chimpanzees Cry, he is shown to comment on the research of joy in rats: the tickling of domesticated rats made them produce a high-pitch sound which was hypothetically identified as laughter.

In his 1998 book Affective Neuroscience, Panksepp described how efficient learning may be conceptually achieved through the generation of subjectively experienced neuroemotional states that provide simple internalized codes of biological value that correspond to major life priorities.

=== Primary affective systems ===
One of Panksepp's most significant contributions to neuroscience and psychology was his discovery and classification of seven biologically inherited primary affective systems called SEEKING (expectancy), FEAR (anxiety), RAGE (anger), LUST (sexual excitement), CARE (nurturance), PANIC/GRIEF (sadness), and PLAY (social joy). He proposed what is known as "core-SELF" to be generating these affects.

This theory is contentious, however. For example, Lisa Feldman Barrett has argued that "it is compelling to believe that 'SEEKING, RAGE, FEAR, LUST, CARE, PANIC, and PLAY'... are biologically basic and derive from architecturally and chemically distinct circuits that are hard coded into the human brain at birth", but cautions "Statements to this effect, no matter how often or forcefully made, are not yet facts; they are hypotheses". She further notes that while "there is some evidence to support the idea that emotions are natural kinds... there is also a tremendous amount of evidence that is inconsistent with this idea".

== Death and legacy ==
Panksepp died on April 18, 2017, from cancer at his home in Bowling Green, Ohio, at the age of 73. Canadian professor and culture critic Jordan Peterson described Panksepp as a "genius" and said he should have gotten a Nobel Prize in psychology if one existed.

== Books ==
- Panksepp, J., and Davis, K. (2018). The Emotional Foundations of Personality: A Neurobiological and Evolutionary Approach. New York: W. W. Norton & Company.
- Watt, Douglas F.; Panksepp, Jaak, eds. (2016). Psychology and neurobiology of empathy. Hauppauge, New York. ISBN 978-1-63484-448-2. OCLC 936234579.
- Narvaez, D., Panksepp, J., Schore, A., & Gleason, T. (Eds.) (2013). "Evolution, Early Experience and Human Development: From Research to Practice and Policy". New York: Oxford University Press.
- Panksepp, J., and Biven, L. (2012). The Archaeology of Mind: Neuroevolutionary Origins of Human Emotion. New York: W. W. Norton & Company.
- Panksepp J (Ed.) (2004) A Textbook of Biological Psychiatry, New York, Wiley
- Panksepp, J. (1998). Affective Neuroscience: The Foundations of Human and Animal Emotions. New York: Oxford University Press.
- Panksepp, J (Ed.) (1996). Advances in Biological Psychiatry, Vol. 2, Greenwich, CT: JAI Press.
- Panksepp, J (Ed.) (1995). Advances in Biological Psychiatry, Vol. 1, Greenwich, CT: JAI Press.
- Clynes, M. and Panksepp, J. (Eds.) (1988). Emotions and Psychopathology, New York, Plenum Press.
- Morgane, J. P., and Panksepp, J. (Eds.). (1981). Handbook of the Hypothalamus: Vol. 4 : Part B. Behavioral Studies of the Hypothalamus. New York: Marcel Dekker, Inc.
- Morgane, J. P., and Panksepp, J. (Eds.). (1980). Handbook of the Hypothalamus: Vol. 3 : Part A. Behavioral Studies of the Hypothalamus. New York: Marcel Dekker, Inc.
- Morgane, J. P., and Panksepp, J. (Eds.). (1980). Handbook of the Hypothalamus: Vol. 2 : Physiology of the Hypothalamus. New York: Marcel Dekker, Inc.
- Morgane, J. P., and Panksepp, J. (Eds.). (1979). Handbook of the Hypothalamus: Vol. 1 : Anatomy of the Hypothalamus. New York: Marcel Dekker, Inc.

== See also ==
- Affective neuroscience
- Empathy
- Laughter
- Neuroscience
- Social neuroscience
