= 1899 in art =

The year 1899 in art involved some significant events.

== Events ==
- January – Camille Pissarro takes an apartment overlooking the Tuileries Garden in Paris and produces a series of paintings of the view.
- December 15 – Glasgow School of Art opens its new building, the most notable work of Charles Rennie Mackintosh.

== Works ==
P. S. Krøyer – Summer Evening at Skagen Beach – The Artist and his Wife

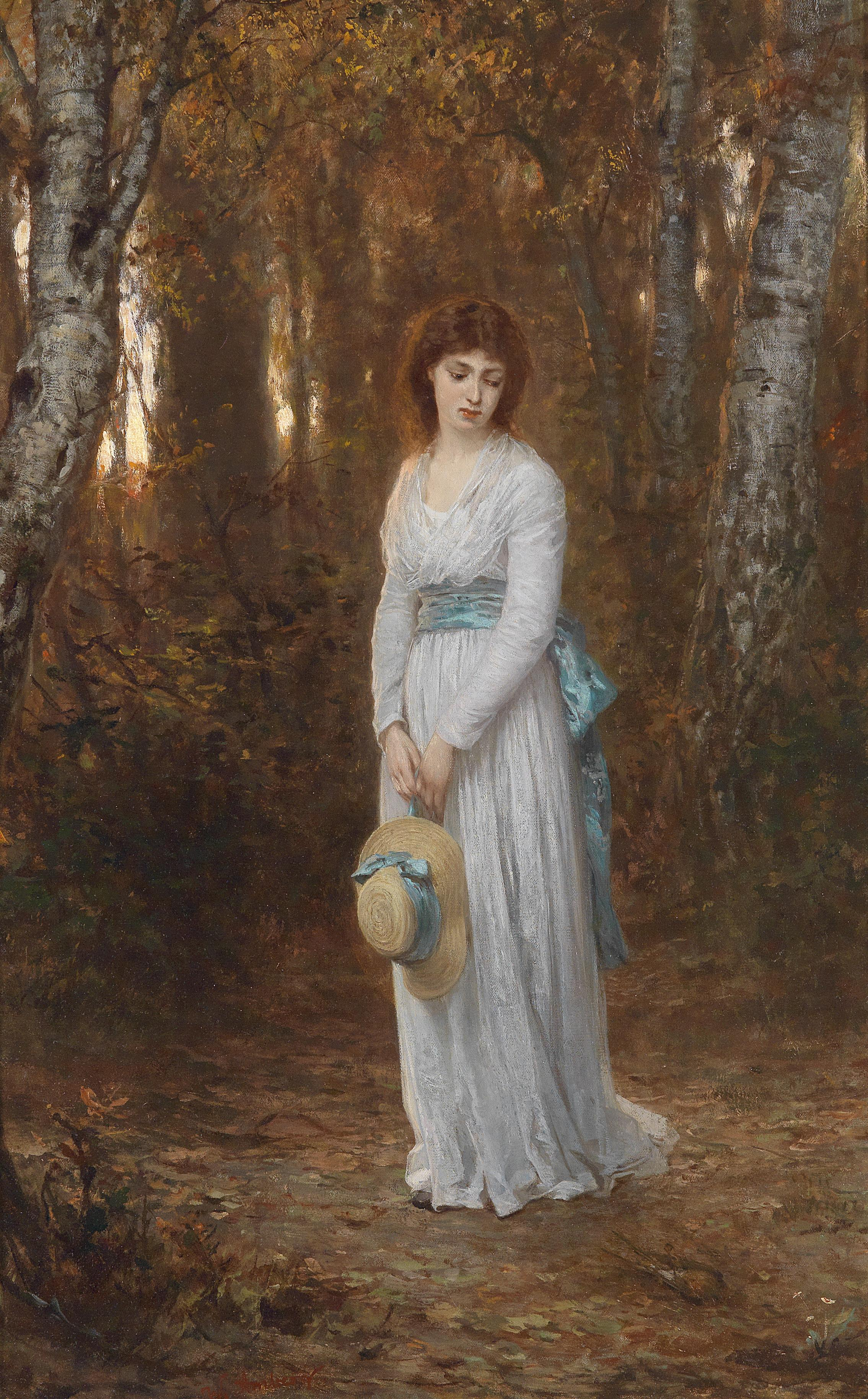
Wilhelm Amberg – Lost in Thoughts

- Almeida Júnior – Saudade
- Wilhelm Amberg – Lost in Thoughts (approx. date)
- Ottó Baditz – Women in the Prison
- Louis-Ernest Barrias – Nature Unveiling Herself Before Science
- Jean-Joseph Benjamin-Constant – Portrait of Queen Victoria
- George Edwin Bissell – Statue of Chester A. Arthur (bronze, New York City)
- Pierre Bonnard – Little Girl with a Cat
- Léon Bonnat – Marie Georgine de Ligne
- Paul Cézanne – Portrait of Ambroise Vollard
- Jules Dalou – Monument à Alphand (Paris)
- Thomas Eakins
  - Portrait of Mary Adeline Williams (first version)
  - Wrestlers
- Jean Leon Gerome Ferris – Signing the Mayflower Compact
- Daniel Chester French and Edward Clark Potter – Equestrian statue of Ulysses S. Grant
- Paul Gauguin – Two Tahitian Women
- J. W. Godward
  - The Bouquet
  - The Delphic Oracle
  - The Mirror
  - The Signal
- Edward Matthew Hale – The Charge of the 21st Lancers at Omdurman
- William Harnett – Violin
- Winslow Homer – The Gulf Stream
- William Holman Hunt – The Miracle of the Holy Fire
- Peder Severin Krøyer – 《Summer Evening at Skagen Beach – The Artist and his Wife》
- Constantin Meunier – The Horse at the Pond (Brussels)
- Claude Monet – Charing Cross Bridge (Thyssen-Bornemisza Museum, Madrid)
- Edvard Munch – The Dance of Life
- John F. Peto – Still life with Mug, Pipe and Book
- Maurice Prendergast – Splash of Sunshine and Rain
- Mykola Pymonenko – A Victim of Fanaticism
- Lionel Royer -Vercingetorix Throws Down His Arms at the Feet of Julius Caesar
- John Singer Sargent
  - An Interior Venice
  - The Wyndham Sisters
- Vardges Sureniants – After the Massacre
- Leon Wyczółkowski – Irena Solska
- W. L. Wyllie – The Battle of the Nile

== Births ==
- January 20
  - Pierre Gandon, French illustrator and engraver of postage stamps (died 1990)
  - Clarice Cliff, English ceramic artist (died 1972)
- February 15
  - Lillian Disney, American artist and wife of Walt Disney (died 1997)
  - Grethe Jürgens, German painter (died 1981)
- February 22 – Dechko Uzunov, Bulgarian painter (died 1986)
- March 20 – G. David Thompson, American industrialist and collector of modern art (died 1965)
- April 27 – Walter Lantz, American cartoonist and animator (died 1994)
- May 22
  - Kosta Hakman, Serbian painter (died 1961)
  - Pan Yuliang, Chinese-born painter (died 1977)
- June 2 – Lotte Reiniger, German silhouette animator and film director (died 1981)
- June 12 – Anni Albers, born Annelise Fleischmann, German-born textile artist and printmaker (died 1994)
- July 3 – Else Halling, Norwegian tapestry weaver (died 1987)
- July 16 – Božidar Jakac, Slovene painter and graphic artist (died 1989)
- July (unknown day) - Isaac Frenkel Frenel, Israeli French painter and sculptor (died 1981)
- August 10 – Margarete Heymann, German-born ceramic artist (died 1990)
- August 19 – Bradley Walker Tomlin, American painter (died 1955)
- September 9 – Brassaï, Hungarian photographer, sculptor, and filmmaker (died 1984)
- September 24 – William Dobell, Australian sculptor and painter (died 1970)
- December 4 – Elfriede Lohse-Wächtler, German avant-garde painter (euthanized 1940)
- December 25 – Raphael Soyer, Russian-born American painter (died 1987)

== Deaths ==
- January 29 – Alfred Sisley, French Impressionist painter (born 1839)
- January 30 – Harry Bates, English sculptor (born 1850)
- March 27 – Myles Birket Foster, English illustrator and watercolour painter (born 1825)
- May 25 – Rosa Bonheur, French painter (born 1822)
- July 21 – Louis Eysen, German painter (born 1843)
- July 29 – Adolf Schreyer, German painter (born 1828)
- August 22 – Caspar Buberl, American sculptor (born 1834)
- November 13 – Almeida Júnior, Brazilian painter (born 1850; murdered)
- December 7 – Juan Luna, Filipino painter (born 1857)
- December 23 – Dominique Antoine Magaud, French painter (born 1817)
