= Journal of the Indian Academy of Applied Psychology =

- Discipline: Applied psychology
- Language: English
- Edited by: Updesh Kumar

Publication details
- History: 1964-present
- Publisher: Indian Academy of Applied Psychology (India)
- Frequency: Biannual

Standard abbreviations
- ISO 4: J. Indian Acad. Appl. Psychol.

Indexing
- ISSN: 0019-4247
- LCCN: 75907347
- OCLC no.: 182846426

Links
- Journal homepage; Current issue

The Journal of the Indian Academy of Applied Psychology is a biannual peer-reviewed academic journal published by the Indian Academy of Applied Psychology, for which it is the official journal. The editor-in-chief is Updesh Kumar (DIPR, DRDO).

The journal primarily publishes empirical research on applied psychology in different domains of life, and contains sections that include case studies, book reviews, and letters to the editor.

== History ==
The journal was established in 1964, two years after the founding of the Indian Academy of Applied Psychology (IAAP) in 1962. In 2012, coinciding with the 50th anniversary of the founding of the IAAP, the journal began publishing articles online in advance of print publication. The print edition currently consists of two issues per year, published in January and July.

== Abstracting and indexing ==
The journal is abstracted and indexed in PsycINFO, Scopus, IndMED, and NCERT Educational Abstracts.

The journal's website also lists it as indexed in Indian Psychological Abstracts & Reviews, an abstracting service published as a journal through 2011.
