= Sadness =

Negative emotional state

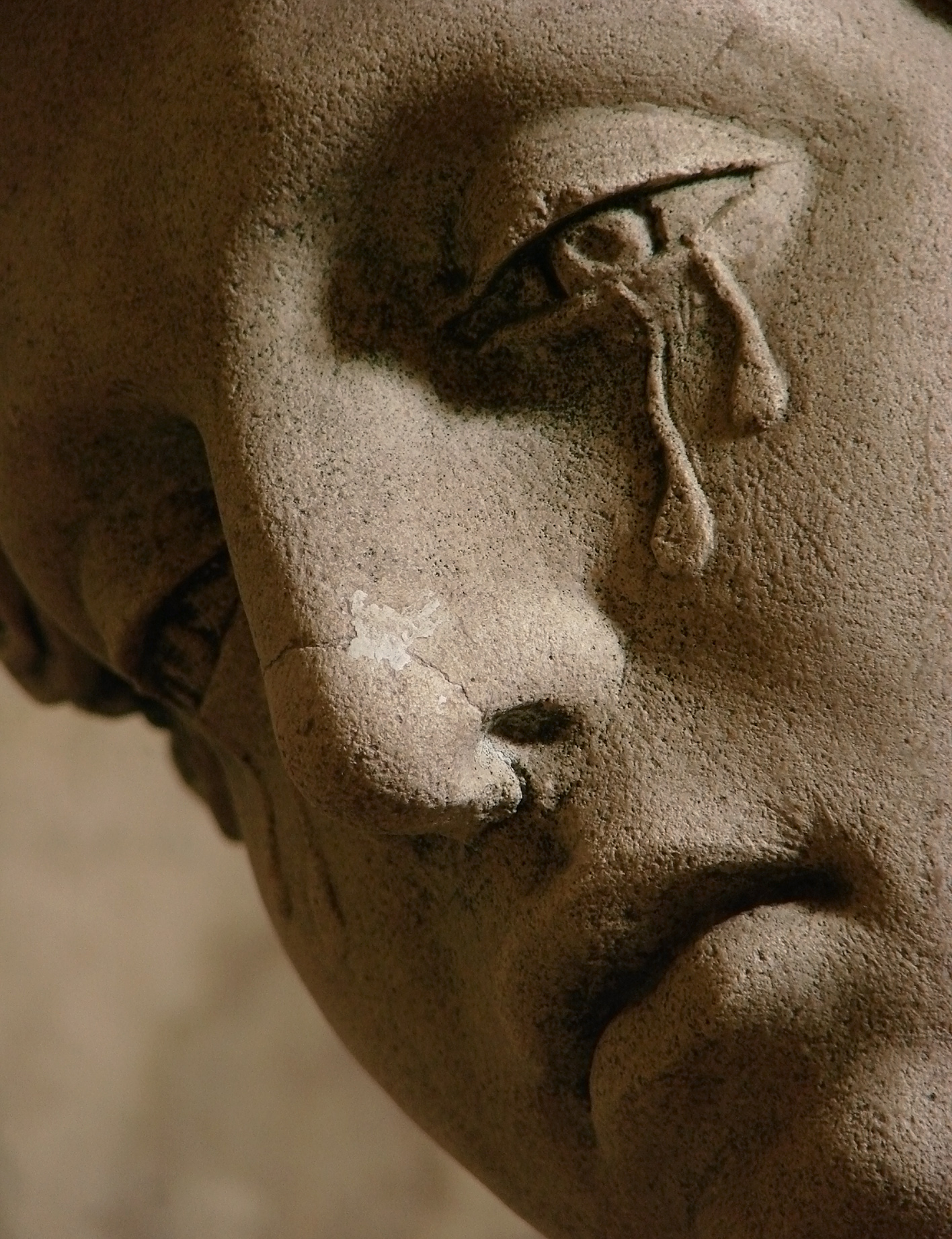
A detail of the 1672 sculpture Entombment of Christ, showing Mary Magdalene crying

Sadness is an emotional pain associated with, or characterized by, feelings of disadvantage, loss, despair, grief, helplessness, disappointment and sorrow. An individual experiencing sadness may become quiet or lethargic, and withdraw themselves from others. An example of severe sadness is depression, a mood which can be brought on by major depressive disorder or persistent depressive disorder. Crying can be an indication of sadness.

Sadness is one of the six basic emotions described by Paul Ekman, along with happiness, anger, surprise, fear, and disgust.

== Childhood ==
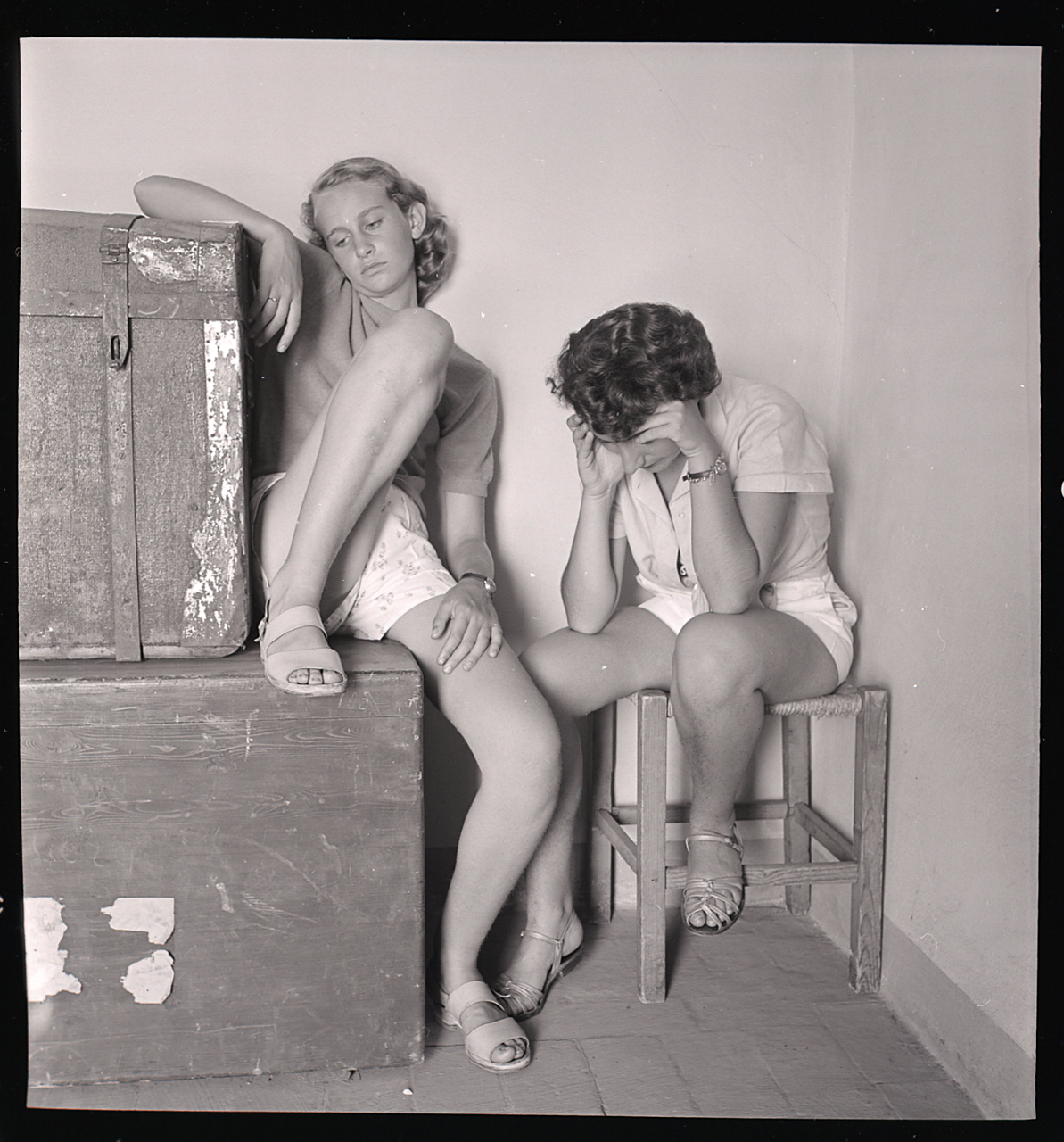
Sad girls. Photo by Paolo Monti, 1953

Sadness is a common experience in childhood. Sometimes, sadness can lead to depression. Some families may have a (conscious or unconscious) rule that sadness is "not allowed", but Robin Skynner has suggested that this may cause problems, arguing that with sadness "screened off", people can become shallow and manic. Pediatrician T. Berry Brazelton suggests that acknowledging sadness can make it easier for families to address more serious emotional problems.

Sadness is part of the normal process of the child separating from an early symbiosis with the mother and becoming more independent. Every time a child separates a little more, he or she will have to cope with a small loss. If the mother cannot allow the minor distress involved, the child may never learn how to deal with sadness by themselves. Brazelton argues that too much cheering a child up devalues the emotion of sadness for them; and Selma Fraiberg suggests that it is important to respect a child's right to experience a loss fully and deeply.

Margaret Mahler also saw the ability to feel sadness as an emotional achievement, as opposed for example to warding it off through restless hyperactivity. Donald Winnicott similarly saw in sad crying the psychological root of valuable musical experiences in later life.

== Neuroanatomy ==
A large amount of research has been conducted on the neuroscience of sadness. According to the American Journal of Psychiatry, sadness has been found to be associated with "increases in bilateral activity within the vicinity of the middle and posterior temporal cortex, lateral cerebellum, cerebellar vermis, midbrain, putamen, and caudate." Using positron emission tomography (PET), researchers were able to provoke sadness among seven normal men and women by asking them to think about sad things. They observed increased brain activity in the bilateral inferior and orbitofrontal cortex. In a study that induced sadness in subjects by showing emotional film clips, the feeling was correlated with significant increases in regional brain activity, especially in the prefrontal cortex, in the region called Brodmann's area 9, and the thalamus. A significant increase in activity was also observed in the bilateral anterior temporal structures.

== Function ==
According to functional theories, emotions are designed to allow people to effectively deal with the situations that evoke the emotion. Sadness is believed to serve two primary functions that enhance one's ability to cope with loss. One function is the promotion of cognitive changes that restructure beliefs and goals and reevaluate implications. For instance, when sad, people tend to be less affected by their schemas in general, including schemas regarding political ideology (the heuristic regarding how a conservative or a liberal should respond) when making political decisions. Another function is to signal a need for assistance and elicit support from others. This may be done by following the group norms, being kinder to others, and expressing the need for help physically and verbally. As a result, the experience of sadness as a group may decrease emotional polarization and increase relationship building.

== Coping mechanisms ==
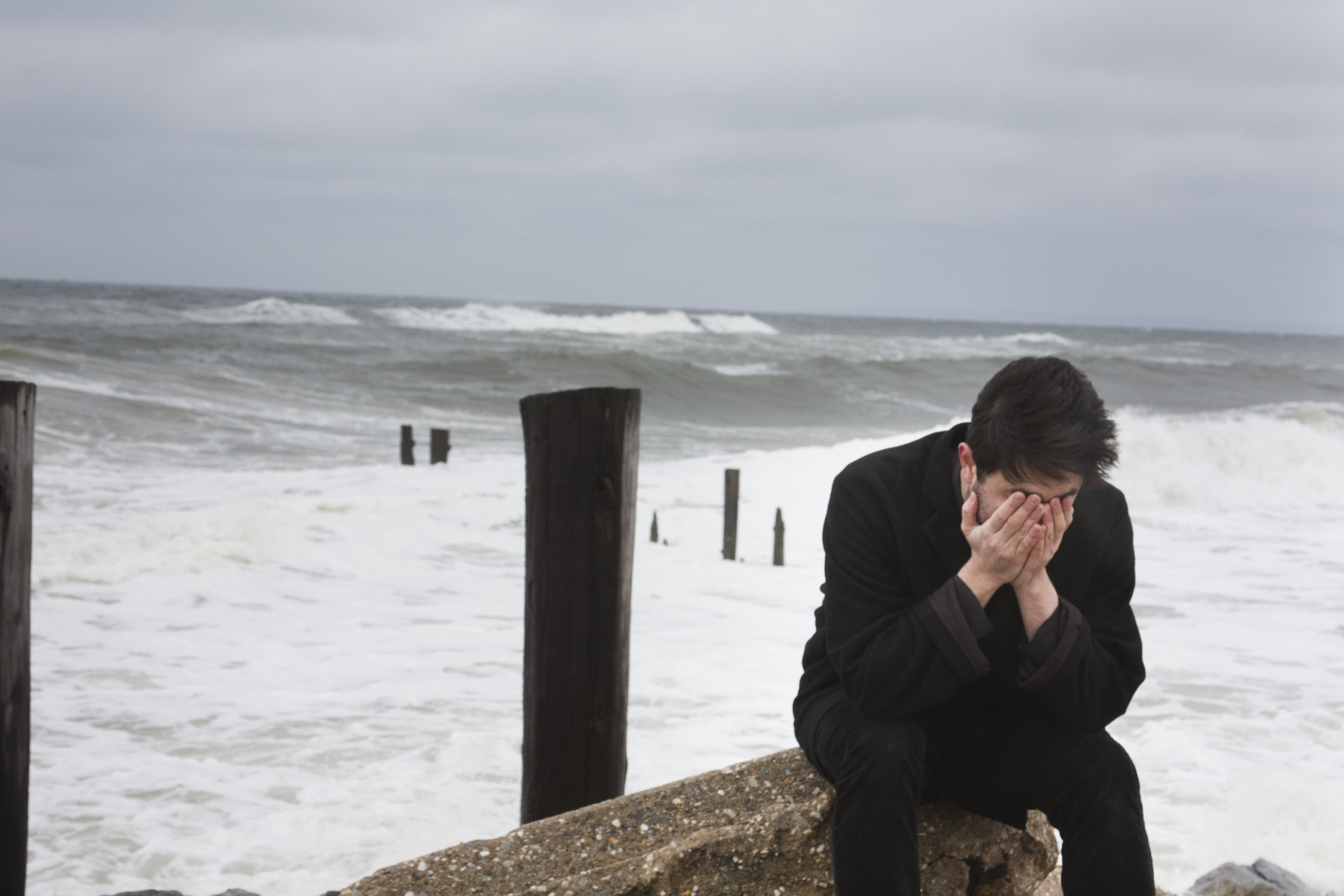
A man expressing sadness with his head in his hands

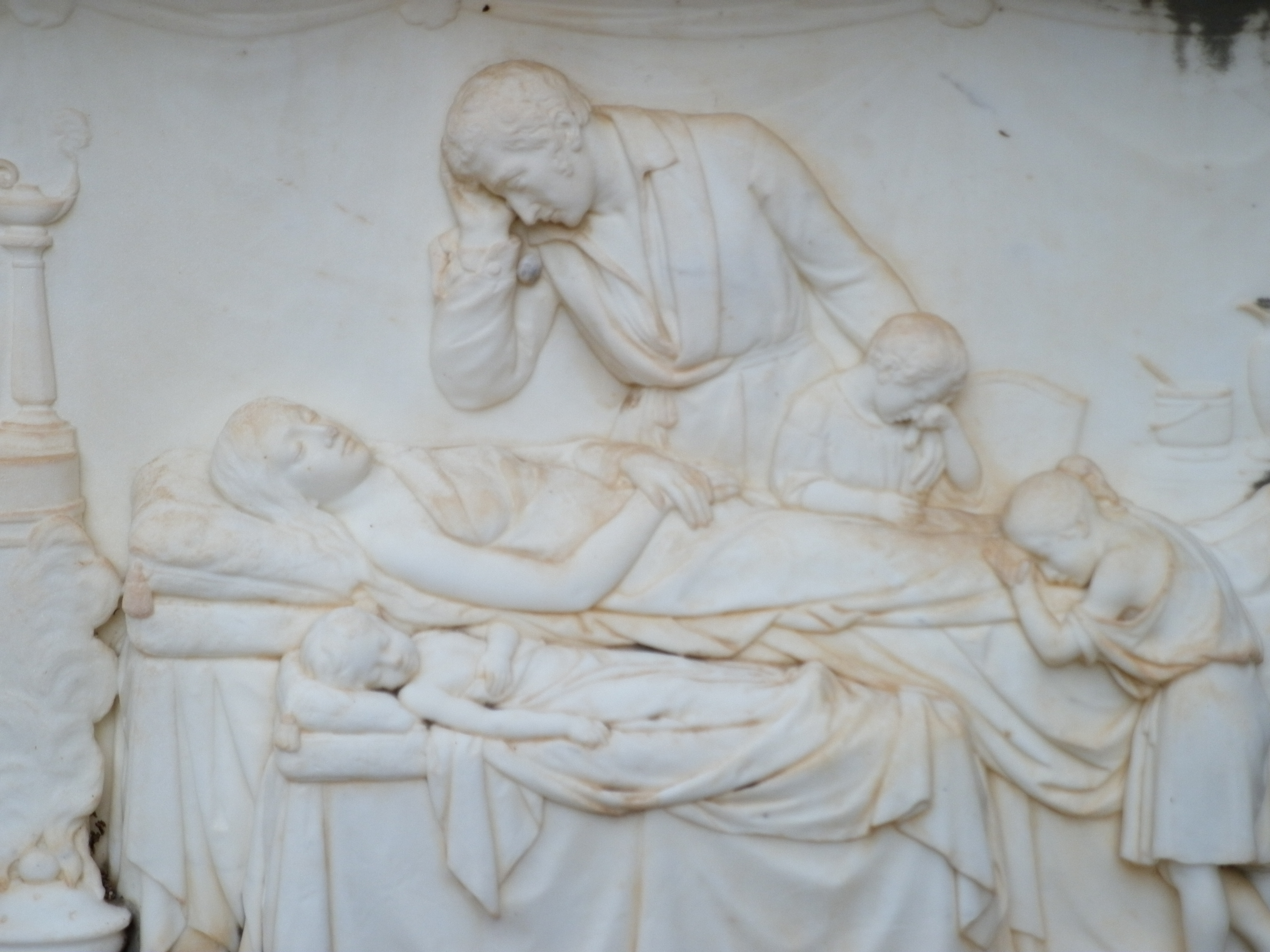
A carving of the family of Marija and Petar Škuljević exhibiting sadness over their deaths

People deal with sadness in different ways, and it is an important emotion because it helps to motivate people to deal with their situation. Some coping mechanisms include: getting social support and/or spending time with a pet, creating a list, or engaging in some activity to express sadness. Some individuals, when feeling sad, may exclude themselves from a social setting, so as to take the time to recover from the feeling.

While being one of the moods people most want to shake, sadness can sometimes be perpetuated by the very coping strategies chosen, such as ruminating, "drowning one's sorrows", or permanently isolating oneself. As alternative ways of coping with sadness to the above, cognitive behavioral therapy suggests instead either challenging one's negative thoughts, or scheduling some positive event as a distraction.

Being attentive to, and patient with, one's sadness may also be a way for people to learn through solitude; while emotional support to help people stay with their sadness can be further helpful. Such an approach is fueled by the underlying belief that loss (when felt wholeheartedly) can lead to a new sense of aliveness, and to a re-engagement with the outside world.

== Pupil empathy ==
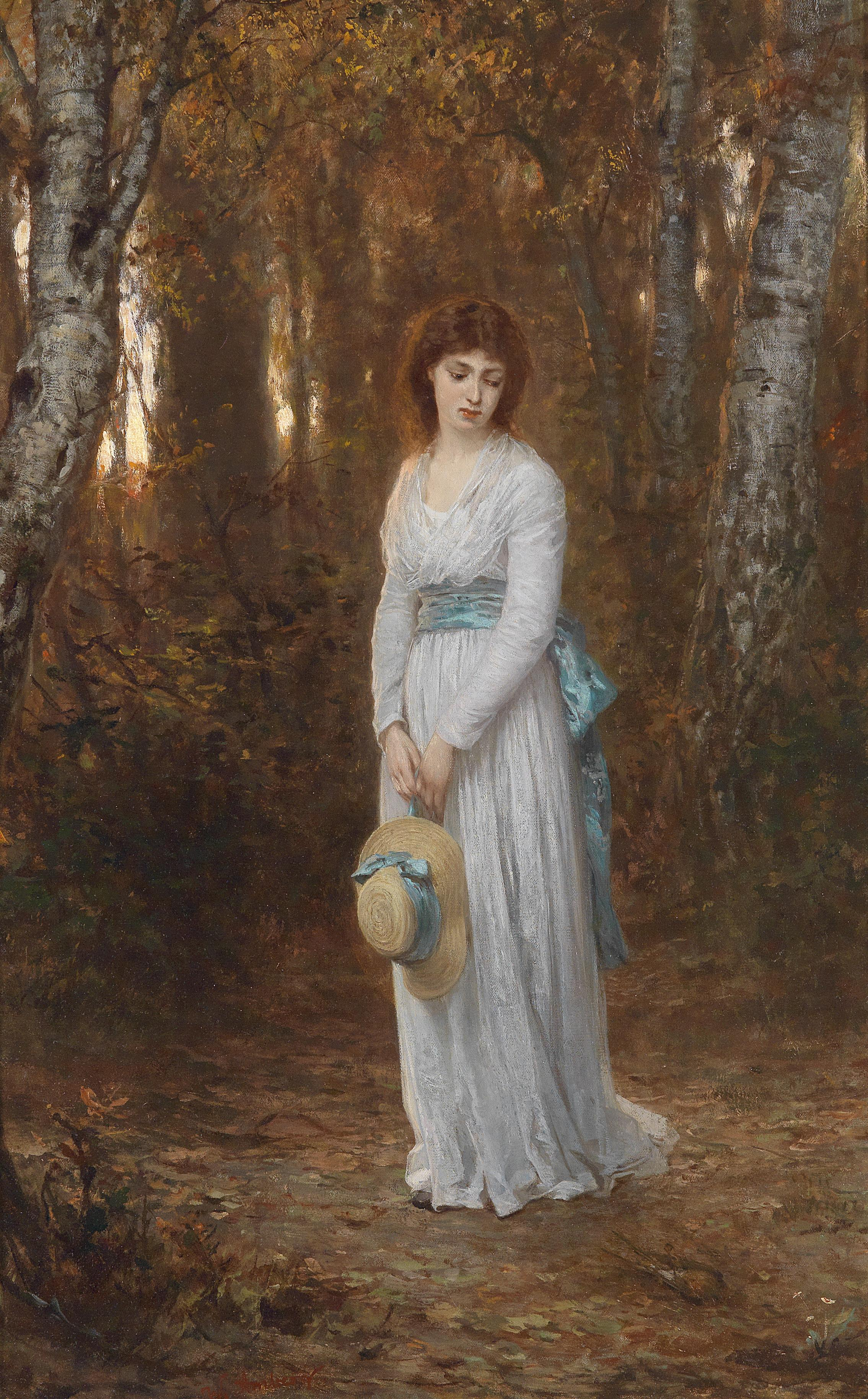
Lost in thoughts, by Wilhelm Amberg. An individual experiencing sadness may become quiet or lethargic, and withdraw themselves from others.

Pupil size may be an indicator of sadness. A sad facial expression with small pupils is judged to be more intensely sad as the pupil size decreases. A person's own pupil size also mirrors this and becomes smaller when viewing sad faces with small pupils. No parallel effect exists when people look at neutral, happy or angry expressions. The greater degree to which a person's pupils mirror another predicts a person's greater score on empathy. In disorders such as autism and psychopathy, facial expressions that represent sadness may be subtle, which may show a need for a more non-linguistic situation to affect their level of empathy.

== Vocal expression ==
According to DIPR scientist Swati Johar, sadness is an emotion "identified by current speech dialogue and processing systems". Measurements to distinguish sadness from other emotions in the human voice include root mean square (RMS) energy, inter-word silence and speaking rate. It is communicated mostly by lowering the mean and variability of the fundamental frequency (f_{0}), besides being associated with lower vocal intensity, and with decreases in f_{0} over time. Johar argues that, "when someone is sad, slow, low pitched speech with weak high audio frequency energy is produced". Likewise, "low energy state of sadness attributes to slow tempo, lower speech rate and mean pitch".

Sadness is, as stated by Klaus Scherer, one of the "best-recognized emotions in the human voice", although it's "generally somewhat lower than that of facial expression". In a study by Scherer, it was found that in Western countries sadness had 79% of accuracy for facial recognition and 71% for vocal, while in Non-Western countries the results were of 74% and 58%, respectively.

== Cultural explorations ==
During the Renaissance, Edmund Spenser in The Faerie Queene endorsed sadness as a marker of spiritual commitment.

In The Lord of the Rings, sadness is distinguished from unhappiness, to exemplify J. R. R. Tolkien's preference for a sad, but settled determination, as opposed to what he saw as the shallower temptations of either despair or hope.

Julia Kristeva considered that "a diversification of moods, variety in sadness, refinement in sorrow or mourning are the imprint of a humanity that is surely not triumphant but subtle, ready to fight and creative".

== See also ==
- Joie de vivre
