= Against Happiness =

Nonfiction book

Against Happiness: In Praise of Melancholy
- Author: Eric G. Wilson
- Language: English
- Subject: Pro-melancholy
- Publisher: Farrar, Straus and Giroux
- Publication date: January 22, 2008
- Publication place: United States
- Media type: Hardback
- Pages: 176
- ISBN: 978-0-374-24066-0
- OCLC: 156818826
- Dewey Decimal: 152.4 22
- LC Class: BF575.M44 W55 2008

Against Happiness: In Praise of Melancholy is a nonfiction book by Eric G. Wilson that examines the benefits of being sad. The author clarifies that diagnosable conditions should be treated accordingly, and is in no way saying it is "normal" or "good" to be depressed. Rather, he seeks to point out that melancholy, or as he dubs it "generative melancholy" can be a powerfully creative force that has motivated the likes of Virginia Woolf, John Keats, Vincent van Gogh, and Ludwig van Beethoven to produce some of the greatest artistic masterpieces of their respective genres. Further, he expresses concern that America's aggressive diagnosis of any negative mood, however slight, as bad, abnormal, or dangerous will lead to an eradication of one of the most powerfully inspirational and motivational forces and its potential products.
