= Sorrow (emotion) =

Emotion of prolonged, resigned sadness

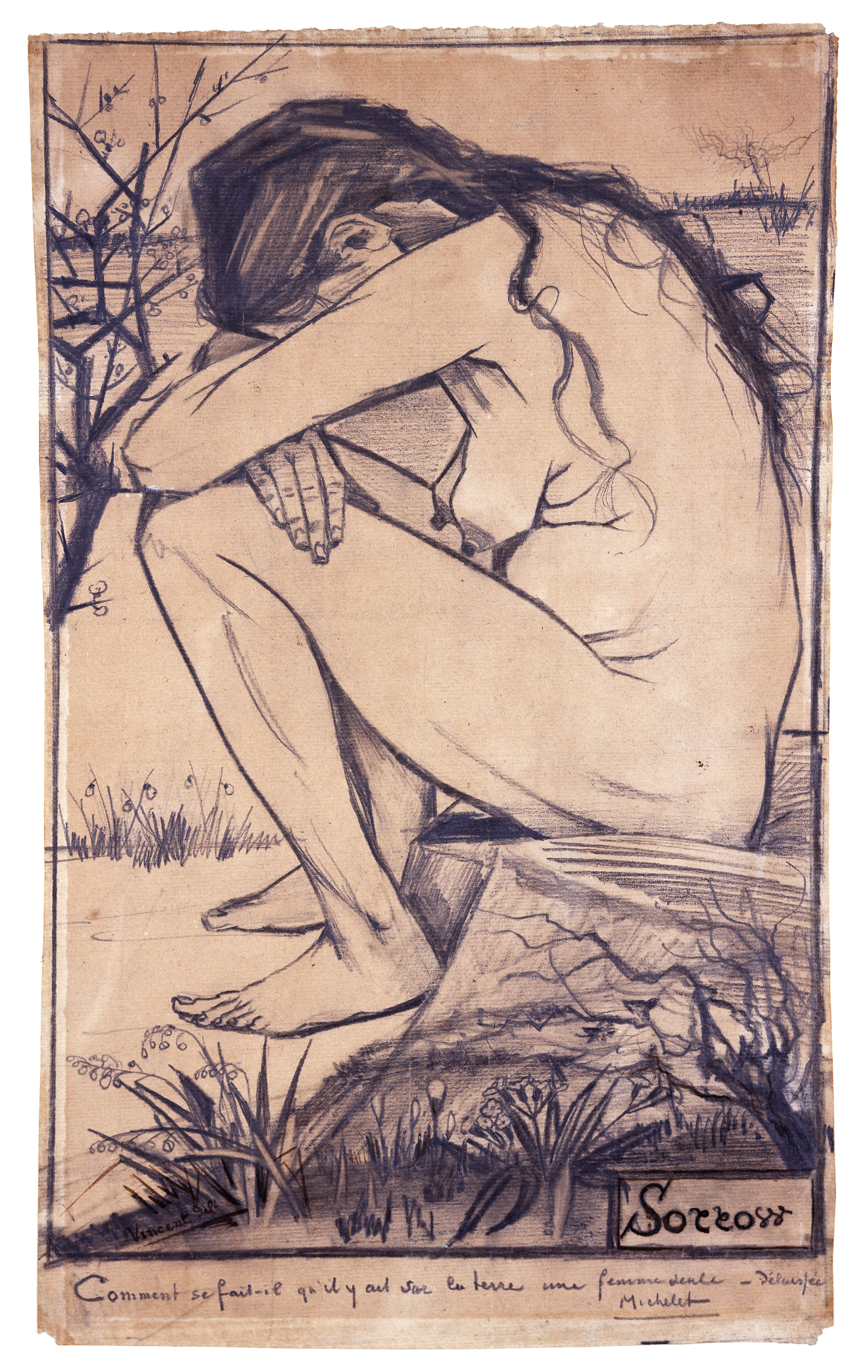
Sorrow, drawing by Vincent van Gogh, 1882

Sorrow is an emotion, feeling, or sentiment. Sorrow is more 'intense' than sadness, implies a long-term state and suggests — unlike unhappiness — a degree of resignation.

Moreover, in terms of attitude, sorrow can be considered halfway between sadness (accepting) and distress (not accepting)".

== Cult ==
Romanticism saw a cult of sorrow develop, reaching back to The Sorrows of Young Werther of 1774, and extending through the nineteenth century with contributions like Tennyson's "In Memoriam" — "O Sorrow, wilt thou live with me/No casual mistress, but a wife" — up to W. B. Yeats in 1889, still "of his high comrade Sorrow dreaming". While it may be that "the Romantic hero's cult of sorrow is largely a matter of pretence", as Jane Austen pointed out satirically through Marianne Dashwood, "brooding over her sorrows... this excess of suffering" may nevertheless have serious consequences.

Partly in reaction, the 20th century has by contrast been pervaded by the belief that "acting sorrowful can actually make me sorrowful, as William James long ago observed". Certainly "in the modern Anglo-emotional culture, characterized by the 'dampening of the emotions' in general... sorrow has largely given way to the milder, less painful, and more transient sadness". A latter-day Werther is likely to be greeted by the call to '"Come off it, Gordon. We all know there is no sorrow like unto your sorrow"'; while any conventional 'valeoftearishness and deathwhereisthystingishness' would be met by the participants 'looking behind the sombre backs of one another's cards and discovering their brightly-colored faces'. Perhaps only the occasional subculture like the Jungian would still seek to 'call up from the busy adult man the sorrow of animal life, the grief of all nature, "the tears of things"'.

Late modernity has (if anything) only intensified the shift: 'the postmodern is closer to the human comedy than to the abyssal discontent...the abyss of sorrow'.

== Postponement ==
'Not feeling sorrow invites fear into our lives. The longer we put off feeling sorrow, the greater our fear of it becomes. Postponing the expression of the feeling causes its energy to grow'. At the same time, it would seem that 'grief in general is a "taming" of the primitive violent discharge affect, characterized by fear and self-destruction, to be seen in mourning'.

Julia Kristeva suggests that 'taming sorrow, not fleeing sadness at once but allowing it to settle for a while...is what one of the temporary and yet indispensable phases of analysis might be'.

== Shand and McDougall ==
Sadness is one of four interconnected sentiments in the system of Alexander Faulkner Shand, the others being fear, anger, and joy. In this system, when an impulsive tendency towards some important object is frustrated, the resultant sentiment is sorrow.

In Shand's view, the emotion of sorrow, which he classifies as a primary emotion, has two impulses: to cling to the object of sorrow, and to repair the injuries done to that object that caused the emotion in the first place. Thus the primary emotion of sorrow is the basis for the emotion of pity, which Shand describes as a fusion of sorrow and joy: sorrow at the injury done to the object of pity, and joy as an "element of sweetness" tinging that sorrow.

William McDougall disagreed with Shand's view, observing that Shand himself recognized that sorrow was itself derived from simpler elements. To support this argument, he observes that grief, at a loss, is a form of sorrow where there is no impulse to repair injury, and that therefore there are identifiable subcomponents of sorrow. He also observes that although there is an element of emotional pain in sorrow, there is no such element in pity, thus pity is not a compound made from sorrow as a simpler component.

== See also ==
- Grief
- Regret (emotion)
- Suffering
