= Updesh Kumar =

- Citizenship: Indian
- Education: Panjab University, Chandigarh
- Scientific career
- Fields: Psychological Science
- Workplaces: Defence Institute of Psychological Research

Updesh Kumar is an Indian scientist who is the former Head of Mental Health, Follow-Up, and Technical Coordination Division at Defence Institute of Psychological Research (DIPR), R & D Organization (DRDO), Ministry of Defence, Delhi. He specializes in the area of personality assessment, suicidal behavior, military psychology, counseling psychology, and health psychology. He was involved in the selection of officers for the Indian Armed Forces, and worked with DRDO, Ministry of Defence, Delhi for about three decades.

== Books ==
- Kumar, Updesh (2010). Suicidal Behaviour: Assessment of People-at-Risk. SAGE. ISBN 9788132102991.
- Kumar, Updesh (2012). Countering Terrorism: Psychosocial Strategies. SAGE. ISBN 9788132109594.
- Kumar, Updesh (2014). Understanding Suicide Terrorism: Psychosocial Dynamics. SAGE. ISBN 9789351500346.
- Kumar, Updesh (2015). Suicidal Behaviour: Underlying Dynamics. ROUTLEDGE, UK & USA. ISBN 9781138580213.
- Kumar, Updesh (2015). Positive Psychology: Applications in Work, Health and Well-being. PEARSON EDUCATION. ISBN 978-9332541313.
- Kumar, Updesh (2016). The Wiley Handbook of Personality Assessment. John Wiley & Sons. ISBN 978-1-119-17344-1.
- Kumar, Updesh (2016). The Routledge International Handbook of Psychosocial Resilience. ROUTLEDGE, UK & USA. ISBN 9781138954878.
- Kumar, Updesh (2017). Handbook of Suicidal Behaviour. Springer Nature, SINGAPORE. ISBN 9789811048159.
- Kumar, Updesh (2019). The Routledge International Handbook of Military Psychology and Mental Health. Routledge, the Taylor & Francis Group, UK & USA. ISBN 9780367237066.
- Kumar, Updesh (2020). Emotion, Well-Being, and Resilience; Theoretical Perspectives and Practical Applications. CRC Press & Apple Academic Press. ISBN 9781771888905.
