= Magyarkeresztúr =

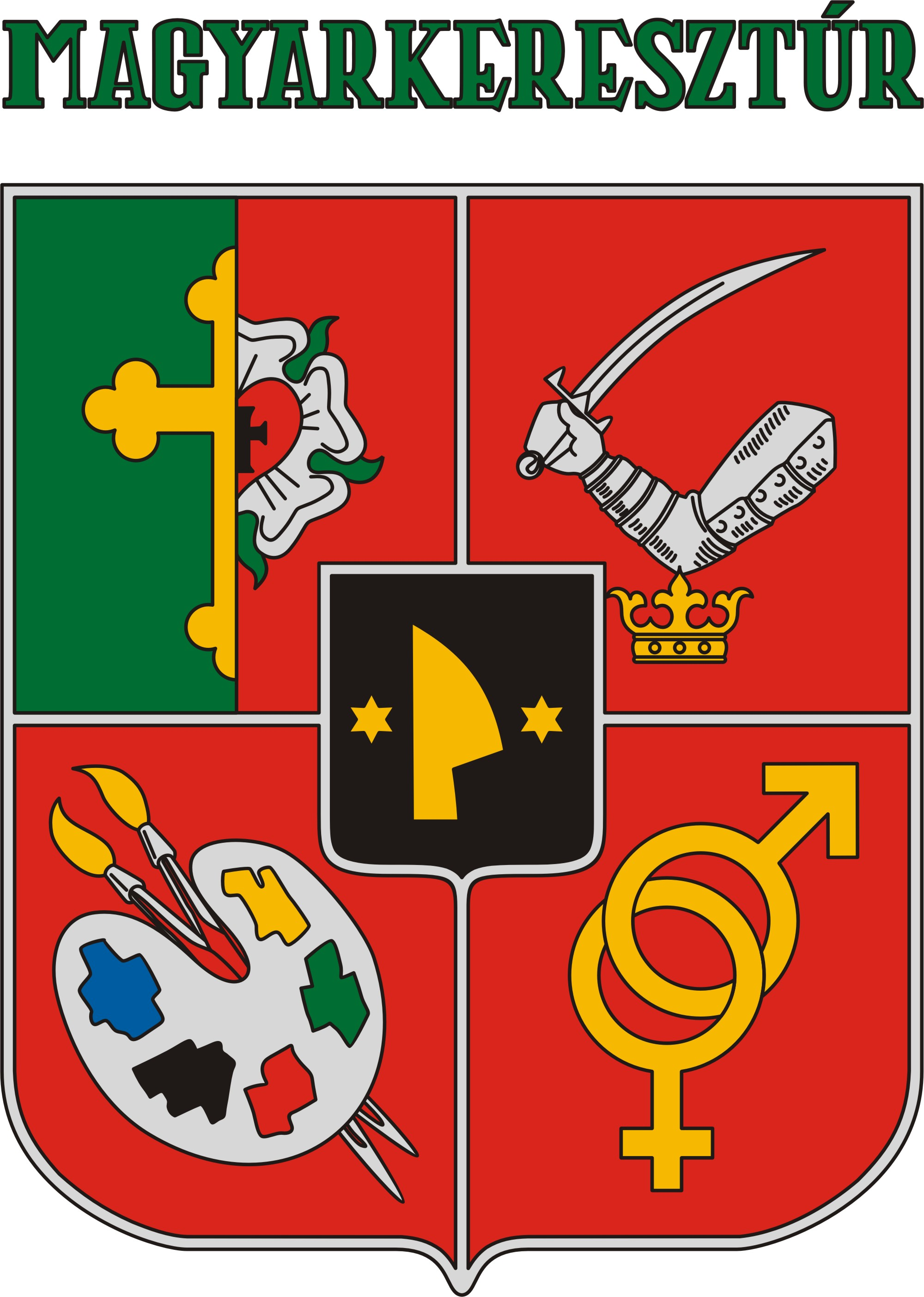
- Coat of arms

- Location of Győr-Moson-Sopron county in Hungary

- Location of Magyarkeresztúr
- Coordinates: 47.52085°N 17.16423°E
- Country: Hungary
- County: Győr-Moson-Sopron

Area
  - Total: 16.76 km^{2} (6.47 sq mi)

Population (2004)
  - Total: 487
  - Density: 29.05/km^{2} (75.2/sq mi)
- Time zone: UTC+1 (CET)
  - Summer (DST): UTC+2 (CEST)
- Postal code: 9346
- Area code: 96
- Motorways: M86
- Distance from Budapest: 168 km (104 mi) East

Magyarkeresztúr is a village in Győr-Moson-Sopron county, Hungary.

It is the death place of painter Ottó Baditz.

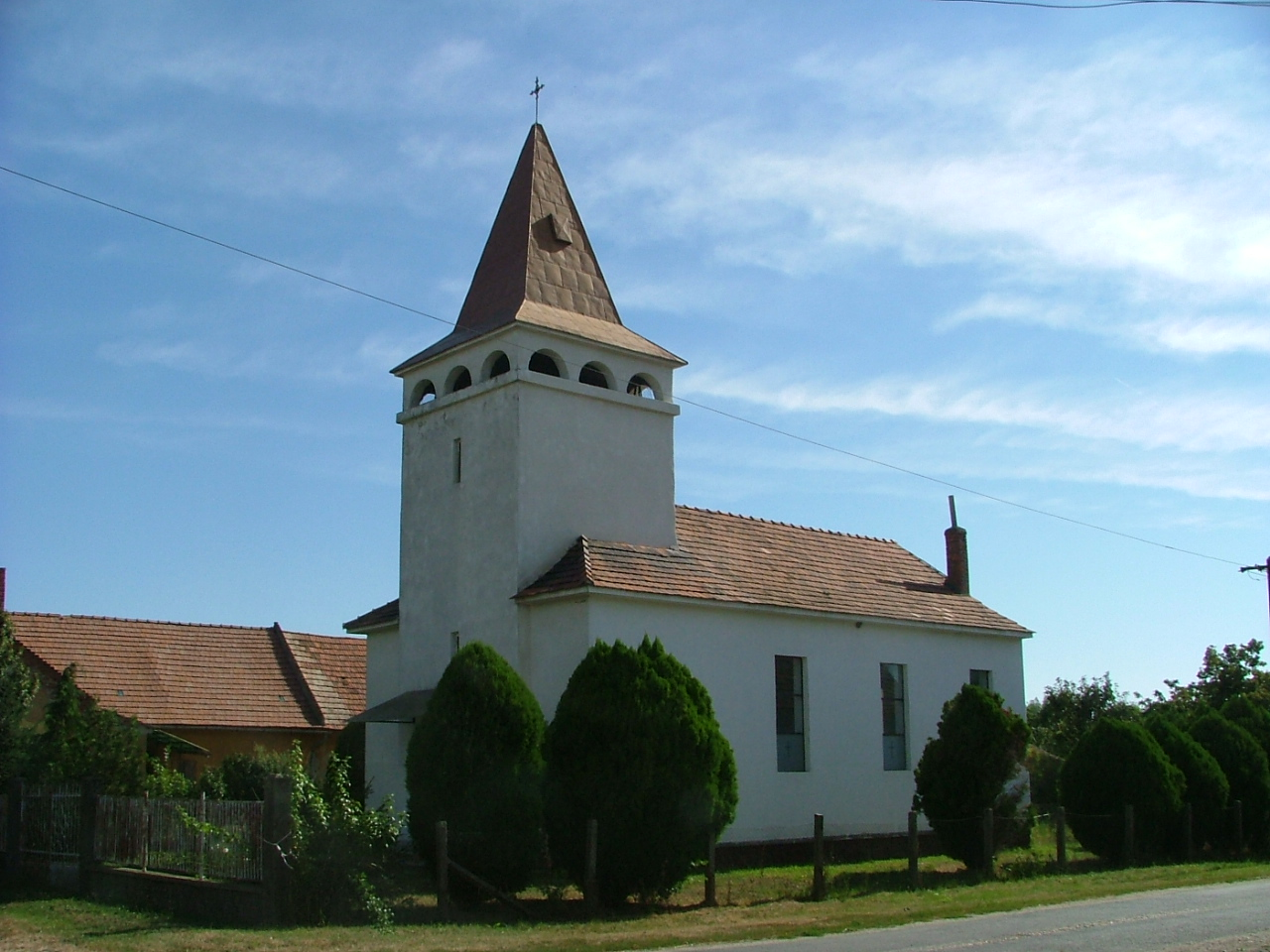
Lutheran church
