= Women in the Prison =

Painting by Ottó Baditz

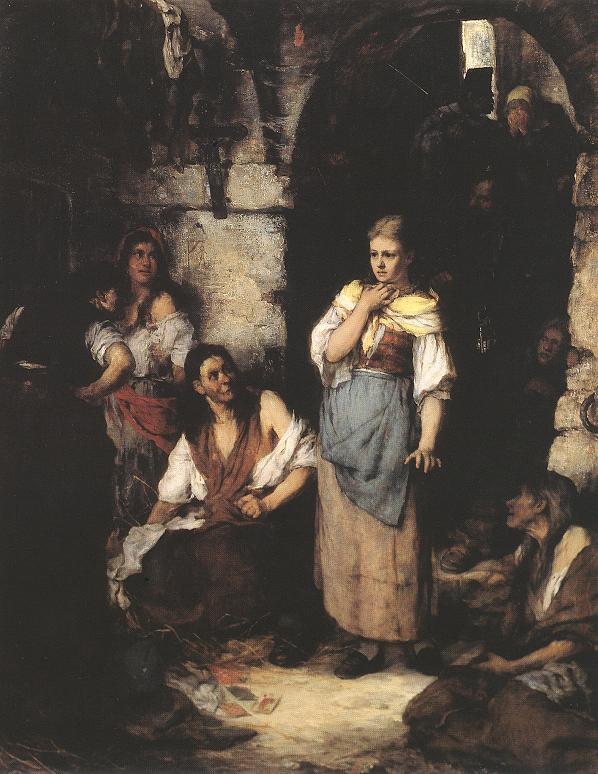
"Women in the Prison"

Women in the Prison is an 1899 painting by Hungarian painter Ottó Baditz. The painting measures exactly 87.5 x 68.5 cm and is currently on display in the Hungarian National Gallery, Budapest.
