= Ottó Baditz =

Hungarian painter and illustrator (1849–1936)

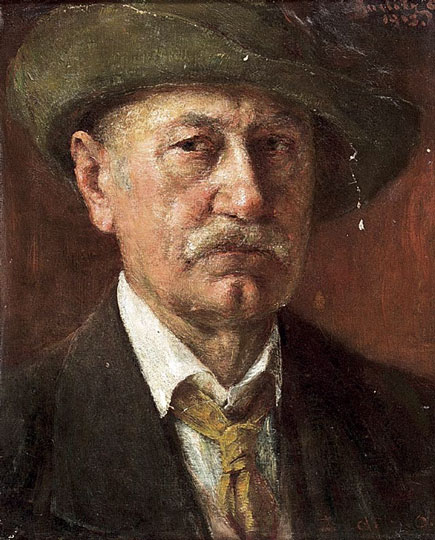
Self-portrait (1913)

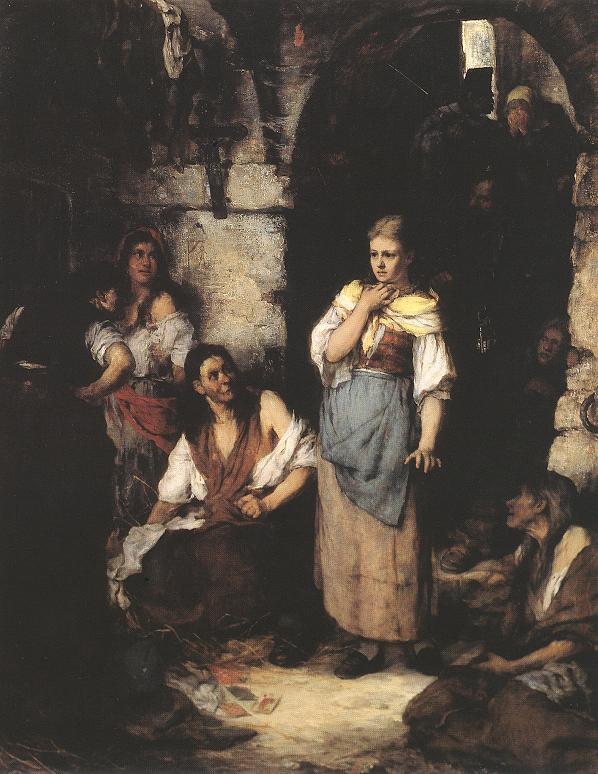
Women in the Prison (1899), his most often reproduced painting.

Ottó Baditz (19 March 1849 – 21 April 1936) was a Hungarian painter and illustrator who specialized in scenes with women and children.

== Biography ==
He was born in Tótkeresztúr. During the 1860s, he studied law in Pozsony (now Bratislava) while taking art lessons from Károly Steinacker (1801–1873) in Sopron. Upon obtaining his law degree, the bibliographer and scholar Lajos Eötvös encouraged him to continue his artistic studies.

In 1870, he enrolled at the Academy of Fine Arts Vienna, where he studied with Carl Wurzinger, followed by studies at the Academy of Fine Arts, Munich, where he took lessons from Wilhelm von Diez and began producing genre scenes of folk-life. Attempts at painting landscapes en plein-air were not to his liking. For almost twenty years, he stayed in Munich, where he shared a studio with Béla Spányi and sent his paintings to exhibitions in Paris and London as well as Budapest. His works proved to be very popular and he soon became wealthy.

He returned to Hungary for a few months every year and, apparently a bit homesick, decided to remain there in 1890. Soon, he became the most sought-after painter for portraits of children. He was a regular participant in the Nemzeti Szalon (National Salon) and briefly served as its director. He won the Grand Prize at the Franco-British Exhibition (1908). Three years later, he settled in the small village of Magyarkeresztúr and lived there until his death. In his later years, his paintings began to show the influence of Mihály Munkácsy. His last exhibition was in 1921.

He also produced numerous book illustrations for works by József Kiss, Sándor Bródy and Mór Jókai, among others.
