= Portrait of Mary Adeline Williams =

Two paintings by Thomas Eakins

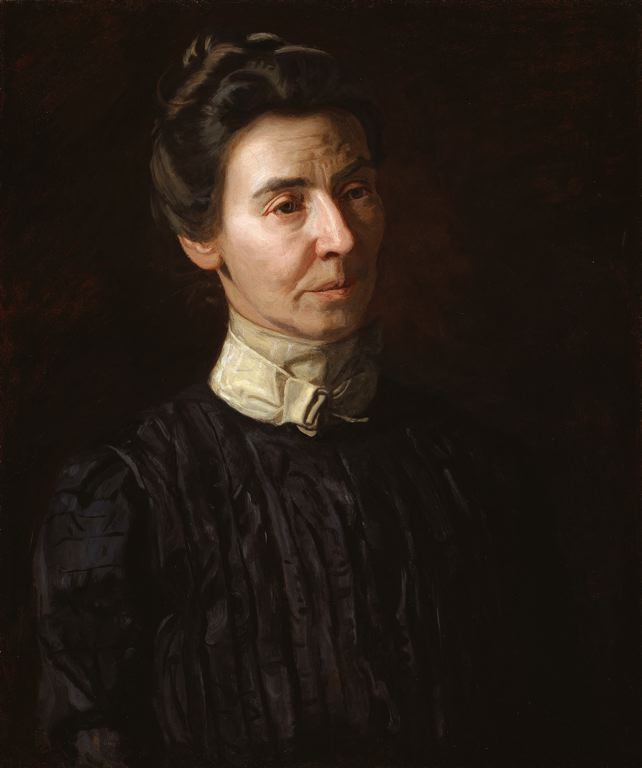
Thomas Eakins. Portrait of Mary Adeline Williams. Oil on canvas, 1899. 61 x 50.8 cm. Art Institute of Chicago.

Portrait of Mary Adeline Williams is the title given to two separate oil on canvas paintings by Thomas Eakins, each depicting Mary Adeline Williams (1853–1941), known familiarly to the Eakins family as "Addie". The first painting, now in the Art Institute of Chicago, was completed in 1899, and portrays the subject with a serious demeanor. The second portrait, in the Philadelphia Museum of Art, was painted in 1900, and is more emotionally expressive. The contrast between the paintings has been called "Perhaps the most famous example of Eakins's transforming a sitter dramatically while maintaining the effect of severe realism."

== Background ==
Mary Adeline Williams was a longtime friend of the Eakins family, a best friend to Eakins' younger sister Margaret, and a distant relation through marriage; she would later say that Thomas Eakins "was like a big brother to me." As early as 1867 Eakins took a protective interest in her, writing to his sister Fanny: "She is a pretty little girl & I guess just as good as she is pretty, or she belies her blood. We owe a great deal to her father & mother for their unvarying disinterested kindness to us....Try to make her welcome whenever she comes to town."

Williams never married, and for some years worked as a seamstress and made corsets. In 1882 Thomas Eakins' father Benjamin invited her to live in the Eakins' home in Philadelphia; Williams demurred, and moved to Chicago, where she lived for six years with one of her brothers. During this time she and Eakins maintained a written correspondence, and the friendship with Eakins' family was further renewed when she returned to Philadelphia in the late 1890s.

Eakins's relationship with Mary Adeline Williams has been the subject of a decades-long debate among art historians. Eakins biographer Lloyd Goodrich conducted interviews with many of Eakins's surviving friends and family members about a decade after Eakins's death. Goodrich himself thought a sexual relationship was unlikely, believing that Eakins would not be inclined to participate in an extramarital affair in his own home. However, he found that many of Eakins's friends believed that his relationship with Williams was sexual in nature. Eakins' student and confidante Samuel Murray stated publicly that he believed the relationship between artist and sitter was sexual, and one of Eakins' nephews believed that Eakins, his wife, and Addie were engaged in a ménage à trois. Other Eakins acquaintances, such as Lucy W. Langdon Wilson, disagreed, noting that Eakins was not interested in seduction, and if a sexual situation developed, she believed "he would leave before the critical moment." It is possible that the portraits reflect Eakins's responsiveness to Williams' varied emotional conditions, rather than recording the effects of a physical relationship.

== Composition ==
The 1899 portrait of Williams depicts her wearing a pleated black dress with a high white collar. Her hair is in a tight bun, set against a dark brown background. Williams is turned slightly to the right, with a strong light cast on that side of her body. Her lips are pursed and her brow is furled; her expression is nearly a scowl. Dark circles are visible under her eyes.

The 1900 portrait depicts Williams from the left side. She is wearing a black dress with red stripes, a pair of red ribbon bowties, and a red ribbon around her neck. Williams's hair is worn down, set against a dark brown background. Her cheek is slightly sunken. Her expression is much softer, virtually inscrutable. The portrait was originally painted on a 24 x 20 inch canvas. Eakins cut two inches off the right side, and tacked it to a new stretcher. This had the effect of re-centering the work on Williams's face.

== Composition history ==
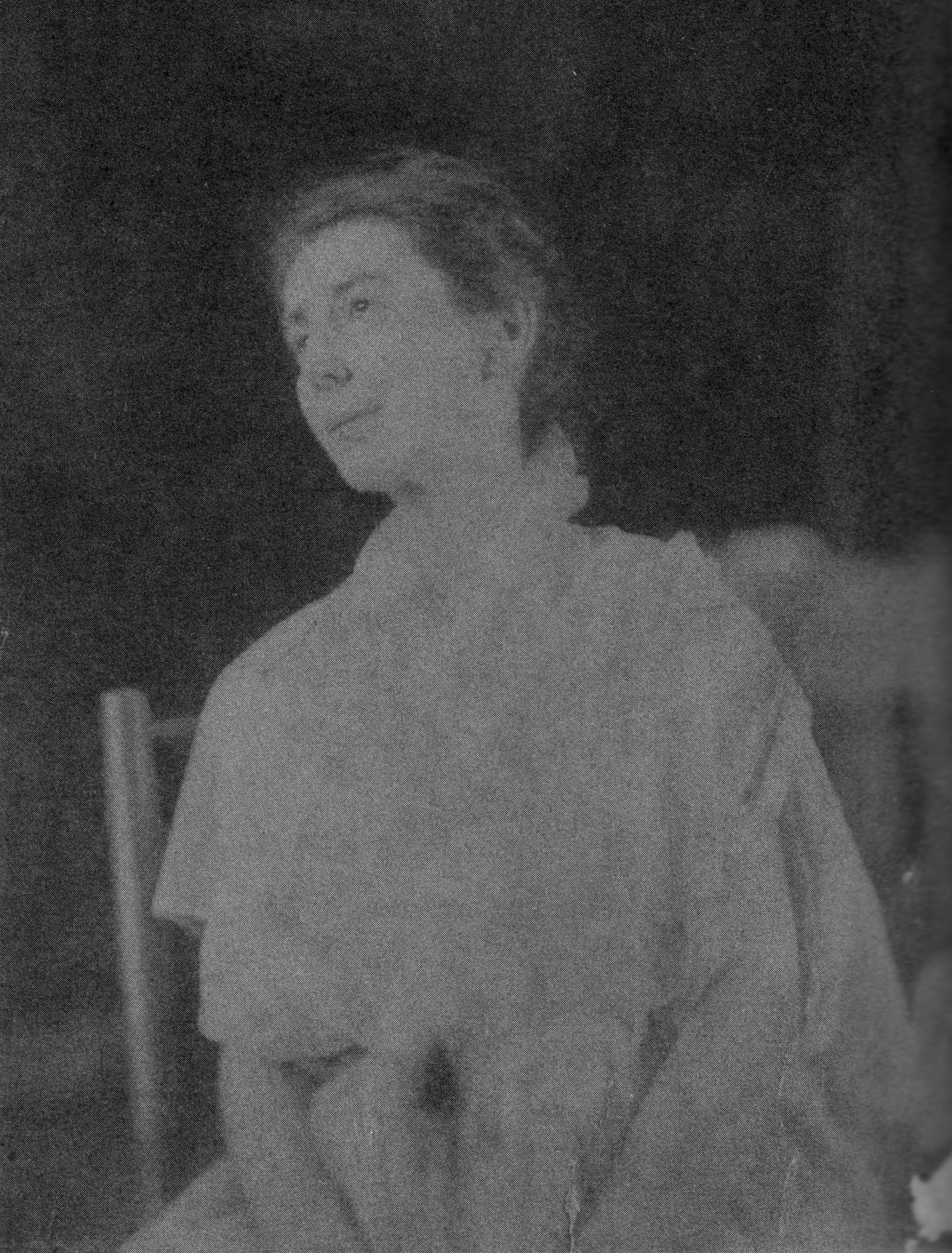
A photograph of Addie Williams, circa 1899, in nearly the same pose as the second portrait. Collection of the Pennsylvania Academy of Fine Arts.

Eakins began the first painting of Addie Williams in late February 1899; his wife Susan Macdowell Eakins recorded in her diary that work had commenced on February 26. In it Addie is seen in three-quarters profile in a dark blouse, described as "prison-bar black", with a light scarf around her neck, its bow tied at the front of her throat. Her hair is tightly tied back, and she sits erect and anxious. The portrait is unflinching in its verisimilitude to the lines of the sitter's face and her subtle frown, and has been seen as representative of "spinsterhood" for its characterization of a fastidious and prim personality. Later Susan Eakins recalled that Addie had been "rather worried" at the time. Eakins continued to work on the painting at least through mid-May of that year. The painting entered the collection of the Art Institute of Chicago in 1939.

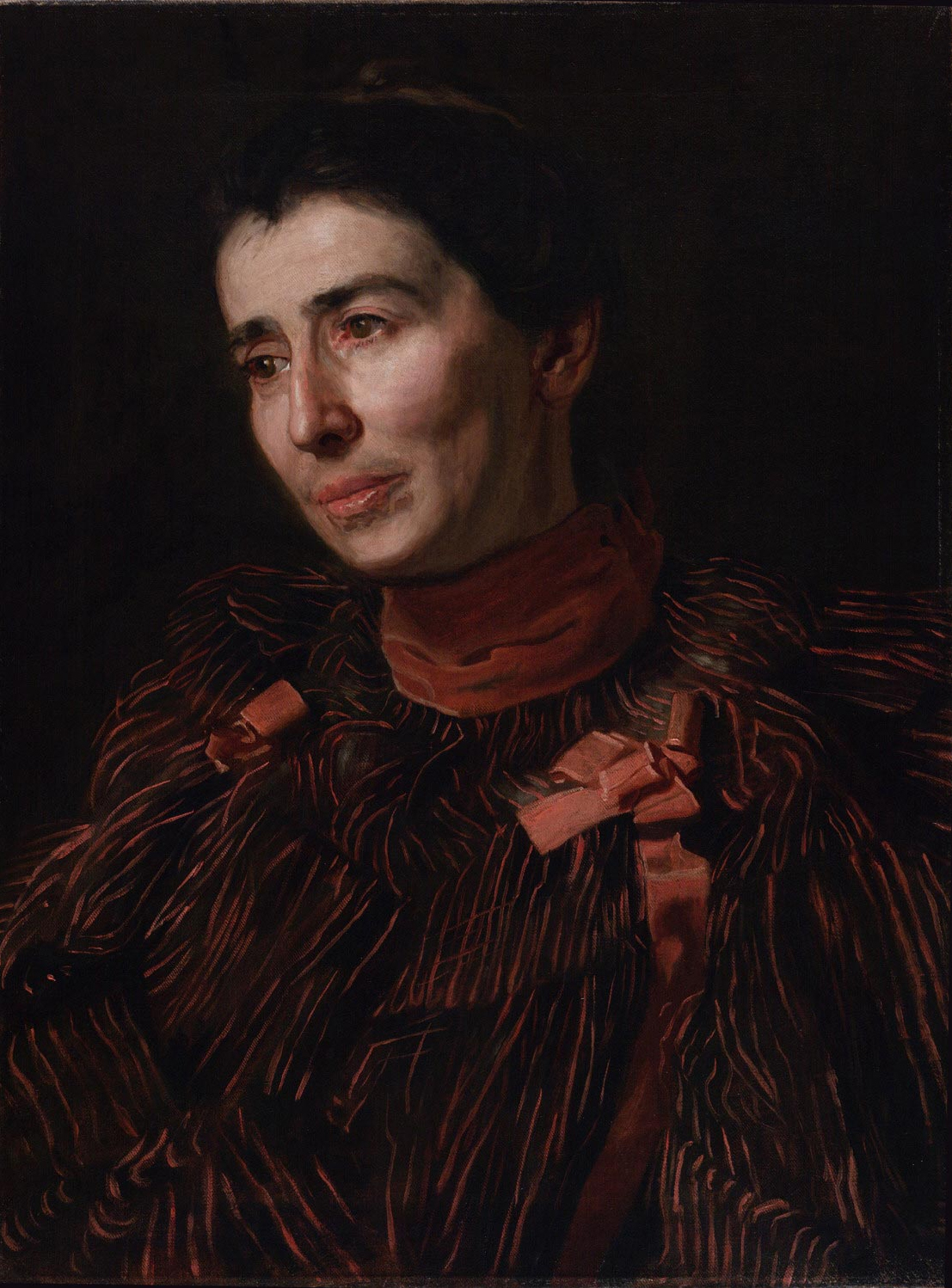
Thomas Eakins. Portrait of Mary Adeline Williams. Oil on canvas, 1900. 61.3 x 46 cm. Philadelphia Museum of Art.

Within the next year Eakins and his wife invited Addie to live with them; she accepted, and remained in their house for nearly forty years. According to Susan Eakins, Williams had become "more relaxed and more tender", and was "a beloved companion in our house." When Lloyd Goodrich visited Susan Eakins and Addie Williams in the 1930s, he found "the two elderly women (Addie was two years younger) seemed like sisters, ready with memories and facts about Tom." Eventually Addie Williams inherited one quarter of Eakins' estate.

The second portrait was painted in 1900, during Williams' first year living in the Eakins home. A pendant to the first portrait, the second painting has been called "a romantic fantasia, or unrestricted variation and development on the original theme"; it is more richly and loosely painted than its predecessor. In this version Addie Williams is turned fully toward the light, appears less troubled, with more richly colored skin and mouth. Her lips are fuller, eyes moister, and her hair less constrained and more natural in appearance. The characterization is more intimate, with the angle of the head implying the sense of resignation that Eakins favored in his later portraits. To Goodrich, she appears to be "a kindly woman, wise, gentle, and warm, with a sense of humor— as I found her to be." Her striped dress is adorned with bows and flounces which hide the body beneath vigorous strokes of red-orange paint; the handling of multi-colored drapery has been compared to virtuoso passages by Eakins' American Impressionist contemporaries. The Philadelphia Museum of Art received the painting as a gift from Susan Macdowell Eakins and Addie Williams in 1929.

== Interpretation ==
The difference in mood between the paintings has been ascribed to the possibility of an affair between Eakins and Williams. Eakins' biographer William Innes Homer contrasted the second portrait, "radiantly affectionate", with a contemporaneous painting the artist made of his wife, in which Susan Eakins appears "worn and strained."

"The two portraits of [Addie Williams] are charged with opposed intellectual and emotional perceptions. In the austere 1899 portrait of Addie, Woman in Black, there is injury and muted stoicism in the introspective look and in the simple reading of anatomy, in the furrowed brow, the hard outlines of forehead, cheek, and jaw, the strong nose, and the firm mouth. This woman endures by a quiet effort of will, half in shadow, half in light. A year later, [Eakins] painted her again, turning her face directly into the light, deepening and modifying that first impression. There is now a softness in the vision, as if he felt more certain that he could without injury strike through to the heart of Addie's womanliness. Her eyes are more fully open, and injury and disappointment are more directly written in them. Her head is less severely modeled; she wears a more colorful scarf and an elaborate striped blouse. But her eyes and mouth are most arresting, imaging an understanding of the failure precisely to achieve the fulfillment, to even approach the fulfillment implied by so much womanliness, so much human responsiveness... One of these portraits is in Chicago, the other in Philadelphia. But they are necessary to one another, and they should be seen together"

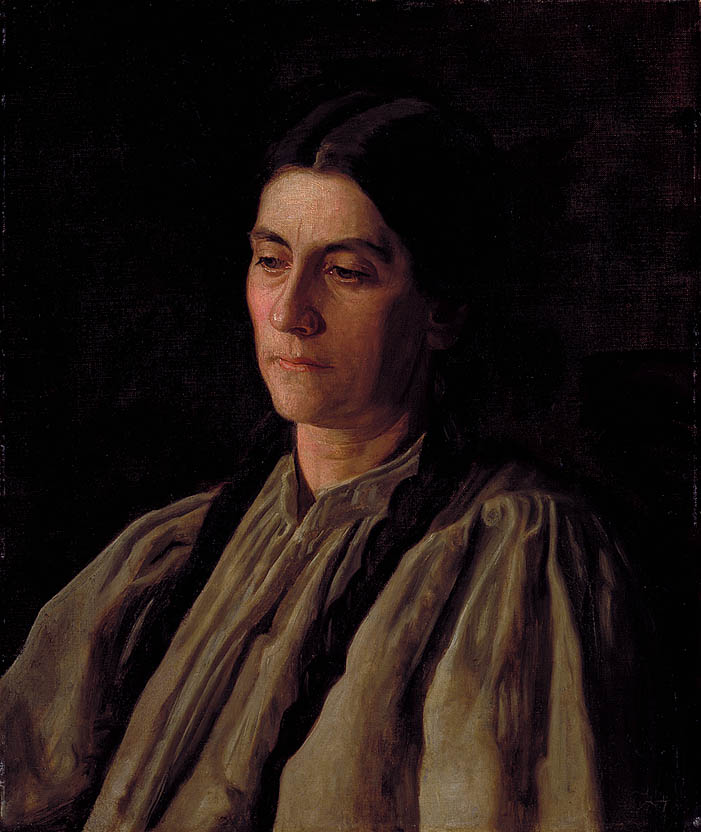
Mother by Thomas Eakins. This is a portrait of Annie Williams Gandy, Addie William's sister. Eakins biographer Margaret McHenry noted that Annie Gandy's expression is the same one as in the second portrait of Addie Williams

Another Eakins biographer, Margaret McHenry, described the portraits by noting that:

"In the first portrait, Addie Williams is in a black dress with a high white collar; her mouth is a bit prim and she is very straight and severe. The second portrait shows her brooding, maternal, devoted, seeming to dream wistful dreams that are half sad, half enchanting. It is the same expression that Eakins read into her sister's face when he painted her sister as Mother... The picture is inscribed on the back, 'To Addie from Tom of Annie,' a cordial friendly inscription on a gift not negligible.

Regarding the warmth of the second portrait, Eakins biographer Elizabeth Johns described Addie as she "tilts her head and smiles gently to imply that all will be, really, all right."

Yet another interpretation questions the assumptions that the portraits reflect Addie Williams' fulfillment through sexual or familial ties, or that they record her changes of mood; rather, the difference in the portraits may document Eakins' more profound perception of Williams as he came to know her better. Eschewing a strictly biographical reading, it is possible that the paintings may also allude to broader cultural assumptions about unmarried women, and to Eakins' interest in visiting variations on a theme.

Referring to Eakins' achievement in the second portrait, Homer wrote: "It is one of the first portraits in which he opened himself up to a particular woman rather than visualizing her according to his earlier intellectualized notion of a woman cast in a masculine mold. The painting marks the beginning of Eakins's ability to empathize with women in portraiture." Goodrich called it "one of his most sympathetic, intimate portraits of a middle-aged woman."

Based on a perceived resemblance, several of Eakins' biographers have speculated that Addie Williams later served as a model for the artist's 1908 nude studies for William Rush and His Model. Goodrich, describing the model for the nudes as " a mature woman" and a distinctive individual, did not see a resemblance to any of Eakins' portraits, and believed her to have been a professional model.

== See also ==
- List of works by Thomas Eakins
