= Wilhelm Amberg =

German painter

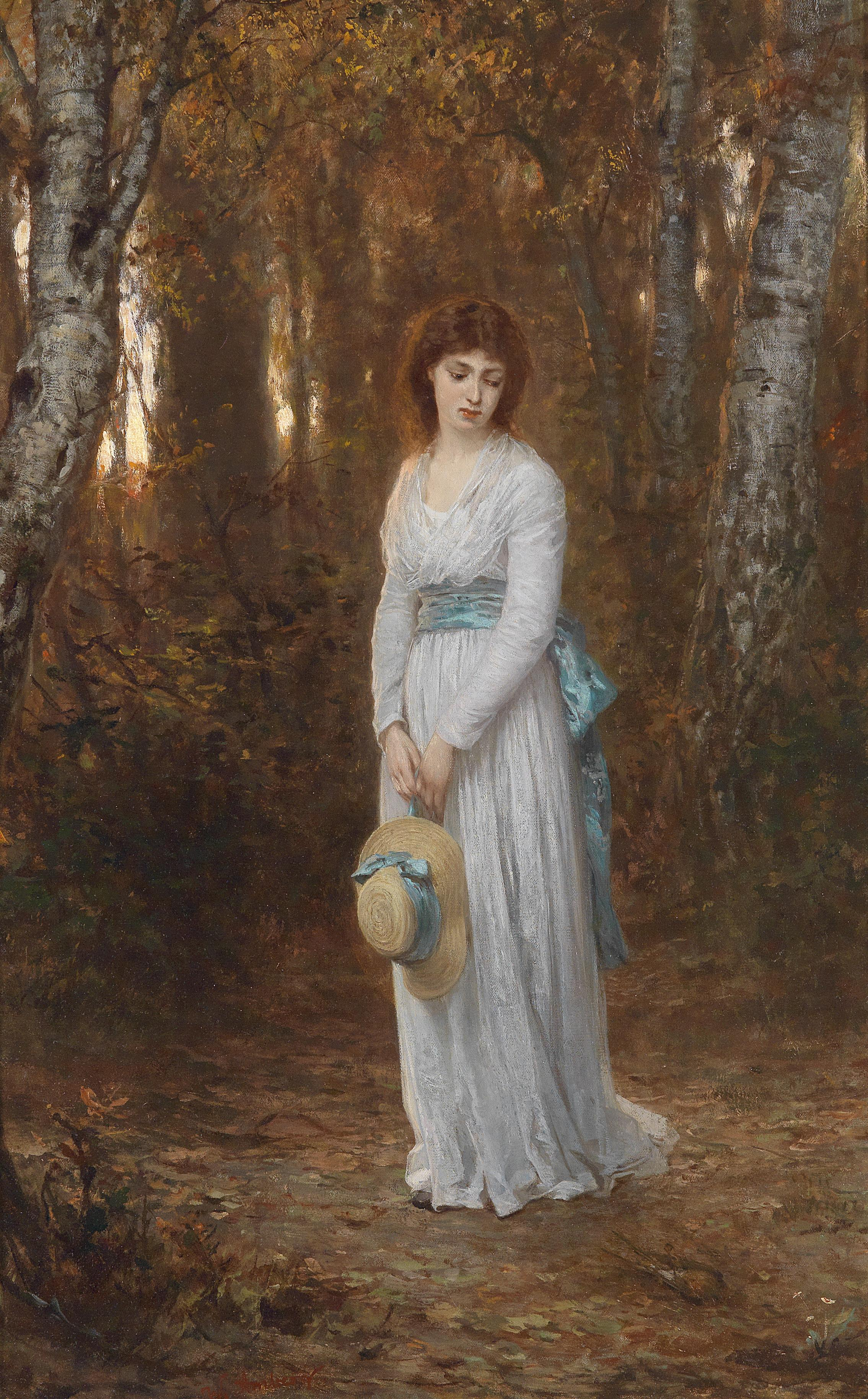
Wilhelm Amberg: In Gedanken versunken - Lost in thoughts

Wilhelm Amberg (25 February 1822 – 10 September 1899) was a German genre painter.

== Biography ==
Amberg was born in Berlin. He was educated by the painters Carl Joseph Begas in Berlin and Léon Cogniet in Paris (1845). After this he spent a couple of years in Rome. His paintings are characterized by humour and a poetic atmosphere. Amberg won many awards and from 1886 was a Member of the Senate of the Prussian Academy of Arts, Berlin. He died in Berlin in 1899.

== Works ==
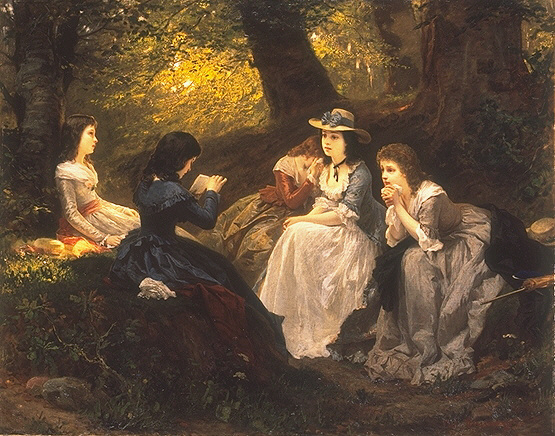
Vorlesung aus Goethes "Werther", Reading from Goethe's Werther, 1870

The painting depicting A reading from the novel The Sorrows of Young Werther shows five young girls seated in a romantic spot in the nature, who went outdoors to read from this novel. One of them is crying, leaning on the other girl's shoulders. The other one is leaning towards the girl reading, with intense attentiveness, also having a handkerchief in her hand, the same as the girl sitting beside the reader. She also has one, that is beside her placed on the vegetation overgrown with moss she sits on ... all the young girls are moved by the lecture.

Soon after its publication in 1774, young women were impressed by the novel and young men began to dress in yellow pants and blue jackets, like young Werther, the main character in the novel. Werther shoots himself with a pistol after he is rejected by the woman he loves, and shortly after its publication there were many reports of young men using the same method to kill themselves in an act of hopelessness.

== Selected works ==
- Trost in Tönen
- Der Witwe Trost
- Die Liebespost
- Die rauchende Zofe
- Naschkätzchen
- Vorlesung aus Goethes "Werther"

== Literature ==
- Eberhard Ruhmer (1953). "Amberg, Wilhelm August Lebrecht". Neue Deutsche Biographie (in German). Vol. 1. Berlin: Duncker & Humblot. p. 241. (full text online).
- Irmgard Wirth: Berliner Malerei im 19. Jahrhundert. Siedler Verlag, Berlin 1990, ISBN 3-572-10011-9, S. 433.
