= Defence Institute of Psychological Research =

Indian defence laboratory

- Established: 1943
- Field of research: Human Psychology
- Director: Ms Nishi Misra
- Location: Lucknow Road, Timarpur, Delhi - 110 054, Delhi; 28.701°N 77.219°E
- Affiliations: Ministry of Defence
- Operating agency: DRDO
- Website: Defence Institute of Psychological Research

Defence Institute of Psychological Research (DIPR) is an Indian defence laboratory of the Defence Research & Development Organisation (DRDO). Located in Delhi, its main function is research in the area of psychology for armed forces personnel. DIPR is organised under the DRDO's Directorate of Life Sciences (DLS). The former director was Dr. Arunima Gupta present director of DIPR is Ms. Nishi Mishra.

== History ==
The history of DIPR dates back to 1943, when it was established in Dehradun as a small experimental board for the selection of Indian Officers in Armed Forces through psychological techniques. After independence, with the reorganisation of the Armed Forces, there was a strong need for a dedicated research cell for the selection and follow-up of the officer cadre. Thus, in 1949, the experimental board was re-christened as the Psychological Research Wing (PRW), with the objective of evolving a scientific system for the selection of officers. With the emergence of new operational challenges in conventional warfare the scope of the institute's charter was further expanded.

PRW made a significant contribution in various areas related to armed forces and earned appreciation from the services headquarters and the Defence Ministry. Consequent to this PRW was expanded with a scope and designated as Directorate of Psychological Research (DPR) on June 28, 1962, to take on new areas of research related to morale, group effectiveness, leadership behaviour, PTSD and other problems related to Armed Forces.

During the same year, Applied Psychological Laboratory (APL) was established as its lower formation. Naval Psychological Research Unit (NPRU) at Kochi which had been established in December 1956 under Defence Science Laboratory (DSL) was made a part of APL in 1962. APL and NPRU were merged into Directorate of Psychological Research (DPR) on 26th August 1967.

In 1982, DPR was brought under the administrative control of DRDO and grew into a full-fledged independent Institute and was designated as the Defence Institute of Psychological Research (DIPR) in October 1982.

In 2024, DIPR began working on developing a psychological assessment test for Agniveer selections, and a psychometric test for Agniveers was also implemented under a trial during the 2023 Agniveer recruitment year.

== Areas of work ==
To take on new areas of research related to morale, ideological convictions, group effectiveness, leadership behaviour, job satisfaction, high altitude effects, motivation, attitude, anthropometrics, civil-military relations and other problems related to Armed Forces. All the selections of officer's in the defence are through DIPR's research only, all material for psychological test were developed by them only. These tests comprises; Picture Perception test, TAT: Thematic apperception Test, WAT: Word association Test, SRT: Situation Reaction test Etc.
