= Yayo Herrero =

Spanish anthropologist, engineer, professor and ecofeminist activist (born 1965)

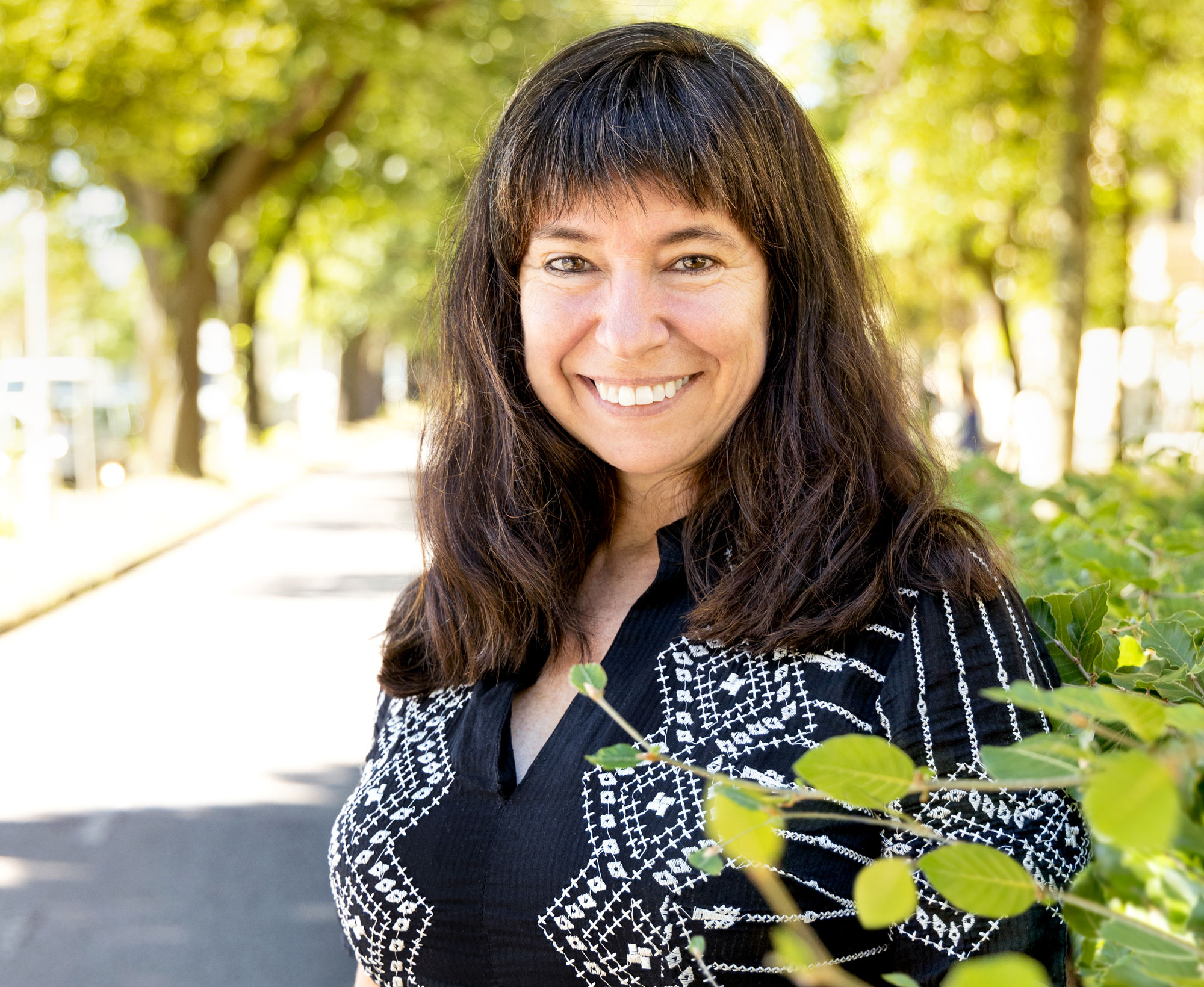
- Born: 1965 (age 60–61); Madrid
- Other names: Yayo Herrero López
- Occupations: Professor, researcher

Academic background
- Education: Social and Cultural Anthropology, Agricultural Engineering, Social Education and Educational Sciences

Academic work
- Main interests: Ecofeminism, ecosocialism

Yayo Herrero López (born 1965 in Madrid) is a Spanish anthropologist, engineer, professor and ecofeminist activist. She is one of the most influential researchers in ecofeminism and ecosocialism at European level.

== Biography ==
Yayo Herrero graduated in Social and Cultural Anthropology, Agricultural Engineering, Social Education and MAS in Education Sciences.

She has been state coordinator of Ecologists in Action and has participated in numerous social initiatives about promotion of Human rights and social ecology. Currently she is a professor at the National University of Distance Education and general director of FUHEM. She collaborates regularly with various media, such as eldiario.es.

In March 2022 she was amongst 151 international feminists signing Feminist Resistance Against War: A Manifesto, in solidarity with the Russian Feminist Anti-War Resistance. (Note: This manifesto was criticized by both Ukrainian feminists and members of the Feminist Anti-War Resistance themselves.)

== Work ==
Herrero's research focuses in the current ecological crisis derived from the capitalist development and production model. In this sense, she argues that capitalism itself cannot exist without economic growth, but in a physical world that has limits, an indefinite growth is impossible. Furthermore, she also argues that in this economic model superfluous jobs are prevailed, while the work that makes possible the maintenance of human life, such as agricultural production or reproductive labor, are completely precarious or directly excluded from any remuneration.

In this way, she proposes a transition towards a different economic model, that takes into account the social inclusion of all people and that is compatible with the regeneration capacity of nature.

=== Featured publications ===
- "La gran encrucijada. Sobre la crisis ecosocial y el cambio de ciclo histórico". Libros en Acción, 2016.
- "Ecologismo: una cuestión de límites". Encrucijadas. Revista Crítica de Ciencias Sociales, 2016.
- "Apuntes introductorios sobre el Ecofeminismo". Boletín del Centro de Documentación Hegoa, 2015.
- "Por una recuperación de la condición humana en un planeta con límites". Documentación social, 2013.
- "Miradas ecofeministas para transitar a un mundo justo y sostenible". Revista de economía crítica, 2013.
- "Golpe de estado en la biosfera: los ecosistemas al servicio del capital". Investigaciones feministas: papeles de estudios de mujeres, feministas y de género, 2011.
- "¿Dominio o cuidado de la tierra?" Éxodo, 2011.
- "Menos para vivir mejor: reflexiones sobre el necesario decrecimiento de la presión sobre los sistemas naturales". El Ecologista, 2010.
- "Decrecimiento y mujeres. Cuidar: Una práctica política anticapitalista y antipatriarcal". Decrecimientos, 2010.
