= Miriam Miranda =

Honduran human and environmental rights activist

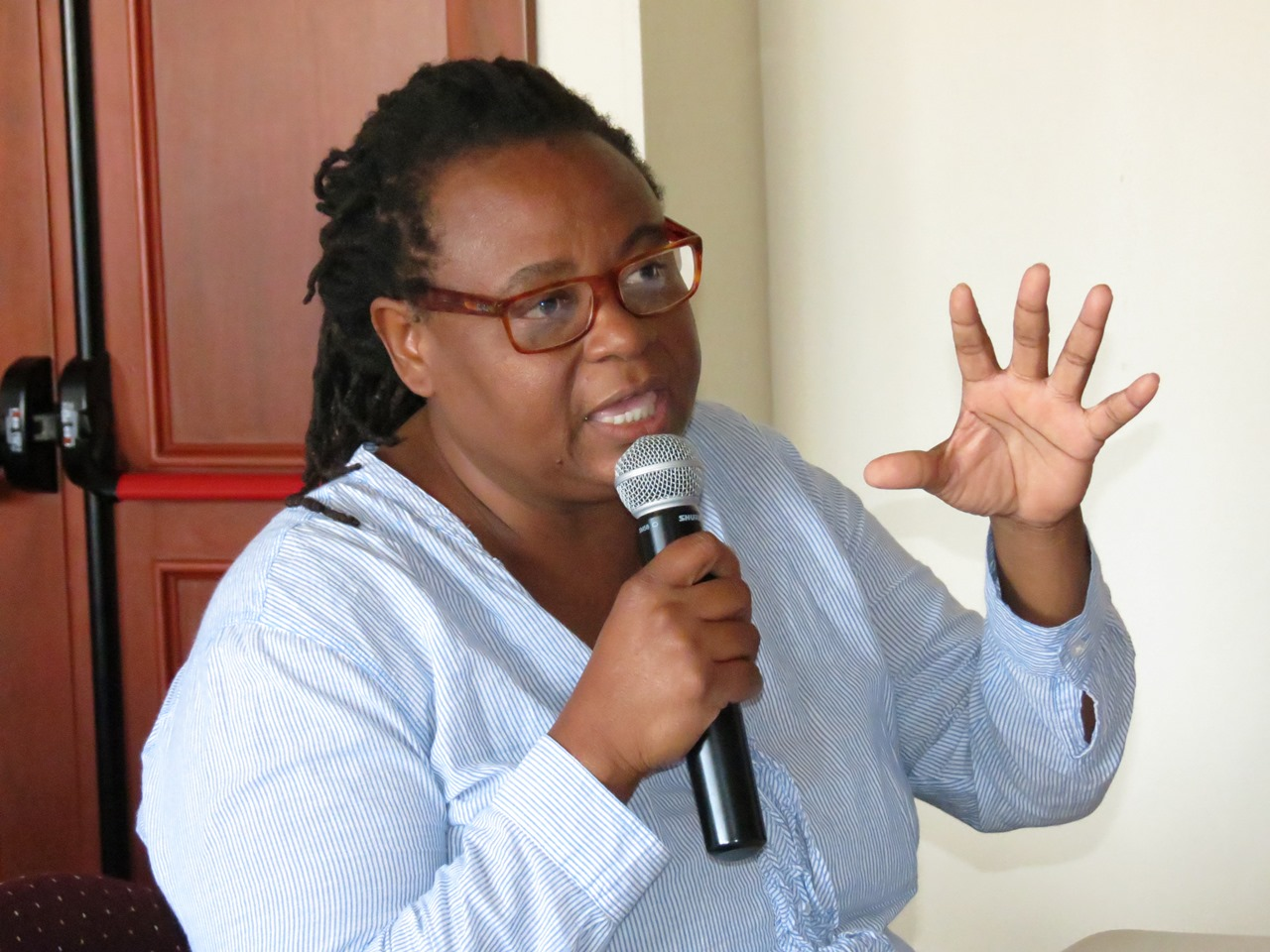
- Born: Santa Fe, Colón, Honduras
- Occupation: Human rights/environmental activist
- Organization: Black Fraternal Organization of Honduras (OFRANEH)
- Awards: Óscar Romero Human Rights Award; Carlos Escaleras environmental prize; International Food Sovereignty Prize

Miriam Miranda is a Honduran activist who advocates for the human and environmental rights of the Garífuna people. As the leader of the Black Fraternal Organization of Honduras (OFRANEH), Miranda has coordinated efforts to counter land theft by big tourism businesses, reclaim ancestral territories formerly belonging to Garífuna communities, stop drug traffickers, promote sustainable environmental practices, and support community leadership development for local youth and women. She has been illegally arrested and beaten by local authorities and kidnapped by drug traffickers.

Miranda has received the Óscar Romero Human Rights Award and the US Food Sovereignty Alliance's International Food Sovereignty Prize. In 2016, she was awarded the Carlos Escaleras environmental prize for 30 years of activist work.

== Early life ==
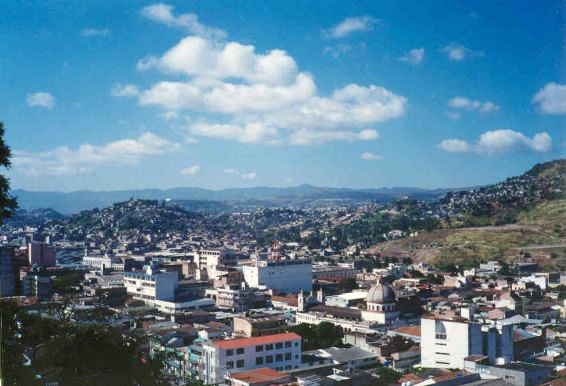
A view of Tegucigalpa, the capital city of Honduras

Miriam Miranda was born in Santa Fe, Colón, a coastal Garífuna community in Honduras. When Miranda was a child, she and her family left the village in search of better work and schooling opportunities, travelling to various banana plantations.

She later studied at a university in Tegucigalpa. During her time as a student, Miranda became increasingly aware of social movements, particularly movements that supported the rights of low-income and indigenous women in Honduras. She eventually decided to focus on advocating for the rights of Garífuna people: mixed-race descendants of West African slaves who escaped to the Caribbean in the 1600s before settling in Central and South American countries such as Honduras.

== Activism ==
=== OFRANEH ===
Miranda is the leader of the Black Fraternal Organization of Honduras (OFRANEH), which was originally established in 1979. The organization actively supports the legal rights of indigenous and Garífuna communities, while also providing resources to support community leadership development, environmental education, health education, and other services.

Members of OFRANEH have occupied areas of land in Honduras that once belonged to Garífuna communities, reclaiming the land as ancestral territory and making use of international human rights laws to avoid eviction. They have also brought legal cases to the Inter-American Court of Human Rights regarding the confiscation of former Garífuna community lands. In 2015, after Canadian businessman Randy Jorgensen illegally built a mega-tourism enterprise on Garífuna land, OFRANEH successfully brought Jorgensen to trial. Miranda has worked to halt other developments disruptive to local communities such as hydroelectric and palm-oil industrial projects.

==== Radio stations ====
In Honduras, most commercial radio and television stations are either controlled or censored by the national government. After activists realized their attempts to protect Garífuna ancestral territory were being hindered or obstructed by local mainstream media, OFRANEH established a new Garífuna community radio station. OFRANEH subsequently partnered with several other community radio stations to create the Mesoamerica Network of Community Radio. OFRANEH now operates six radio stations across Honduras.

One of the radio stations funded and organized by OFRANEH, named Faluma Bimetu (Garífuna for "sweet coconut"), is located in the northern Honduras village of Triunfo de la Cruz. The station was established in 1997, and broadcasts a 24-hour cycle of traditional music and shows on topics such as environmental issues, domestic violence, substance abuse, health, spirituality, and leadership development for youth and women. Faluma Bimetu has been targeted for its work – in 2010, the radio station was hit by an arson attempt that damaged the building and its broadcasting equipment. Although the police made no arrests, some activists alleged that the arson was the work of the Indura Beach and Golf Resort, a tourism corporation that has been accused of evicting Garífuna families and illegally redrawing land boundaries in order to build new hotels.

Other OFRANEH radio stations have focused on highlighting social injustices and the work of local activists. In 2016, Radio Lumamali Giriga broadcast an interview with Honduran activist Madeline David Fernandez, who had been arrested and allegedly tortured by Honduran police. The story was subsequently picked up by other radio stations and organizations.

==== Threats, illegal arrests and kidnappings ====
The British NGO Global Witness has called Honduras "the deadliest place on earth" for activists working against big businesses. Between 2010 and 2017, approximately 120 Honduran activists were killed. Miranda has been threatened and kidnapped in retaliation for her work, and has been publicly portrayed as a criminal in local news media.

On March 28, 2012, during a time when non-violent public protests were taking place across Honduras, Miranda was beaten by police and military, then arrested and detained for twelve hours. She was charged with sedition upon her release.

In 2014, OFRANEH activists discovered that drug traffickers had clear-cut swaths of forest to build an illegal air strip in northern Honduras. After authorities were notified, the air strip was destroyed by the Honduran Army. A few months later, when Miranda and several colleagues revisited the area and found that the traffickers had returned, they were kidnapped and held for several hours by armed men employed by the traffickers.

In January 2017, while in the port city of La Ceiba, Miranda and three other Garífuna community leaders were arrested and illegally detained by police. The arrest happened in spite of the fact that Honduras authorities had been ordered by the Inter-American Court of Human Rights to provide police protection for Miranda.

== Role of women as activists ==
Traditionally, Garífuna ancestral lands in Honduras are inherited by women and passed down to their children. Women are often deeply involved in the protection of land and the preservation of cultural traditions.

In interviews, Miranda has emphasized her belief in the importance of acknowledging women as defenders of communities and cultural heritage:

Everywhere throughout Honduras, like in all of Latin America, Africa, Asia, women are at the forefront of the struggles for our rights, against racial discrimination, for the defense of our commons and our survival. We're at the front not only with our bodies but also with our force, our ideas, our proposals. We don't only birth children, but ideas and actions as well.

In March 2022 she was amongst 151 international feminists signing Feminist Resistance Against War: A Manifesto, in solidarity with the Russian Feminist Anti-War Resistance. (Note: This manifesto was criticized by both Ukrainian feminists and members of the Feminist Anti-War Resistance themselves.)

== Awards and recognition ==
In 2015, OFRANEH received the International Food Sovereignty Prize from the US Food Sovereignty Alliance. Miranda was also named co-recipient of the Óscar Romero Human Rights Award, alongside Honduran environmental activist Berta Caceres. In October 2016, in recognition of her work defending Garífuna rights for 30 years, Miranda was awarded the Carlos Escaleras environmental prize.
