= Huang Xihua =

Chinese politician

Huang Xihua (born c. 1966) is a Chinese politician and a representative of the Guangdong region in the National People's Congress of China.

Huang graduated from the Jiangxi Agricultural University majoring in soil. Huang is a member of the Chinese Communist Party. She served as the director of the Tourism Bureau of Huizhou in Guangdong. She later served as the Deputy Secretary-General of Huizhou's municipal government. Huang has been a deputy to the National People's Congress since 2008. In 2013, she served as a deputy to the NPC. Huang advocates for the cancellation of birth restrictions and for the liberalization of childbirth in China. On February 24, 2018, Huang was elected as a representative of the 13th National People's Congress.
