= Amaia Pérez Orozco =

Spanish economist

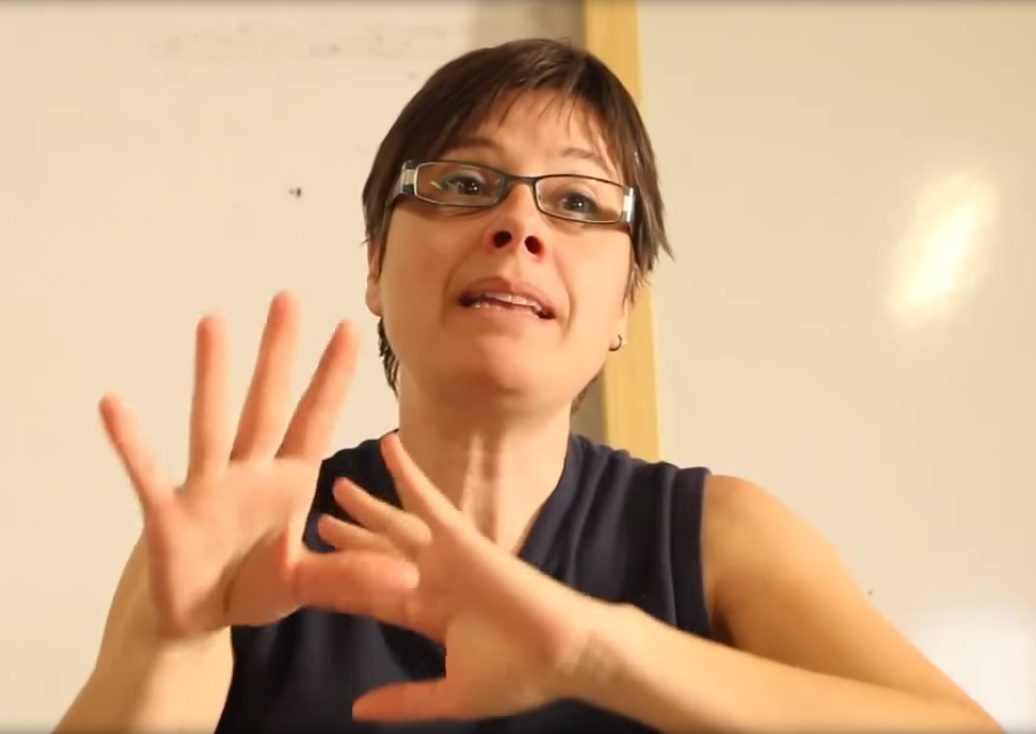
- Education: Charles III University of Madrid; Complutense University of Madrid
- Scientific career
- Fields: Feminist economics; Development economics; International economics
- Workplaces: Complutense University of Madrid

Amaia Pérez Orozco is a Spanish economist and feminist activist. She specializes in feminist economics and the economic theory of sustainable living.

== Life and work ==
Pérez Orozco studied economics at the Charles III University of Madrid, where she focused on feminist and environmental economics. She then obtained a doctorate in International and Development Economics from the Complutense University of Madrid. Her doctoral thesis studied the case of care work from the perspective of feminist economics. It was entitled Perspectivas feministas en torno a la economia. El caso de los cuidados (Feminist perspectives on the economy: The case of care).

After obtaining her PhD at the Complutense University of Madrid, Pérez Orozco became a professor of Applied Economics there. She also worked on the organisation of care-intensive labour markets with the United Nations International Research and Training Institute for the Advancement of Women, publishing work for the United Nations on topics like global care chains.

Pérez Orozco's academic work largely focuses on the economic theory of sustainable living and markets, and feminist economic theory. In 2014, she published Subversión feminista de la economía (A feminist subversion of the economy), in which she argues for a re-imagining and restructuring of labour markets to prioritize the sustainability of human life. A core part of this project would be to pay workers for the types of labour that are essential to the continuation of human life, such as food preparation and child care, but which are very often unpaid in contemporary labour markets. Subversión feminista de la economía was also a work of feminist economics, since these unpaid but essential categories of labour are disproportionately performed by women worldwide.

In March 2022 she was amongst 151 international feminists signing Feminist Resistance Against War: A Manifesto, in solidarity with the Russian Feminist Anti-War Resistance. (Note: This manifesto was criticized by both Ukrainian feminists and members of the Feminist Anti-War Resistance themselves.)

== Selected works ==
- Perspectivas feministas en torno a la economía: el caso de los cuidados (2006)
- Subversión feminista de la economía (2014)
