= Care work =

Tasks that meet the needs of others

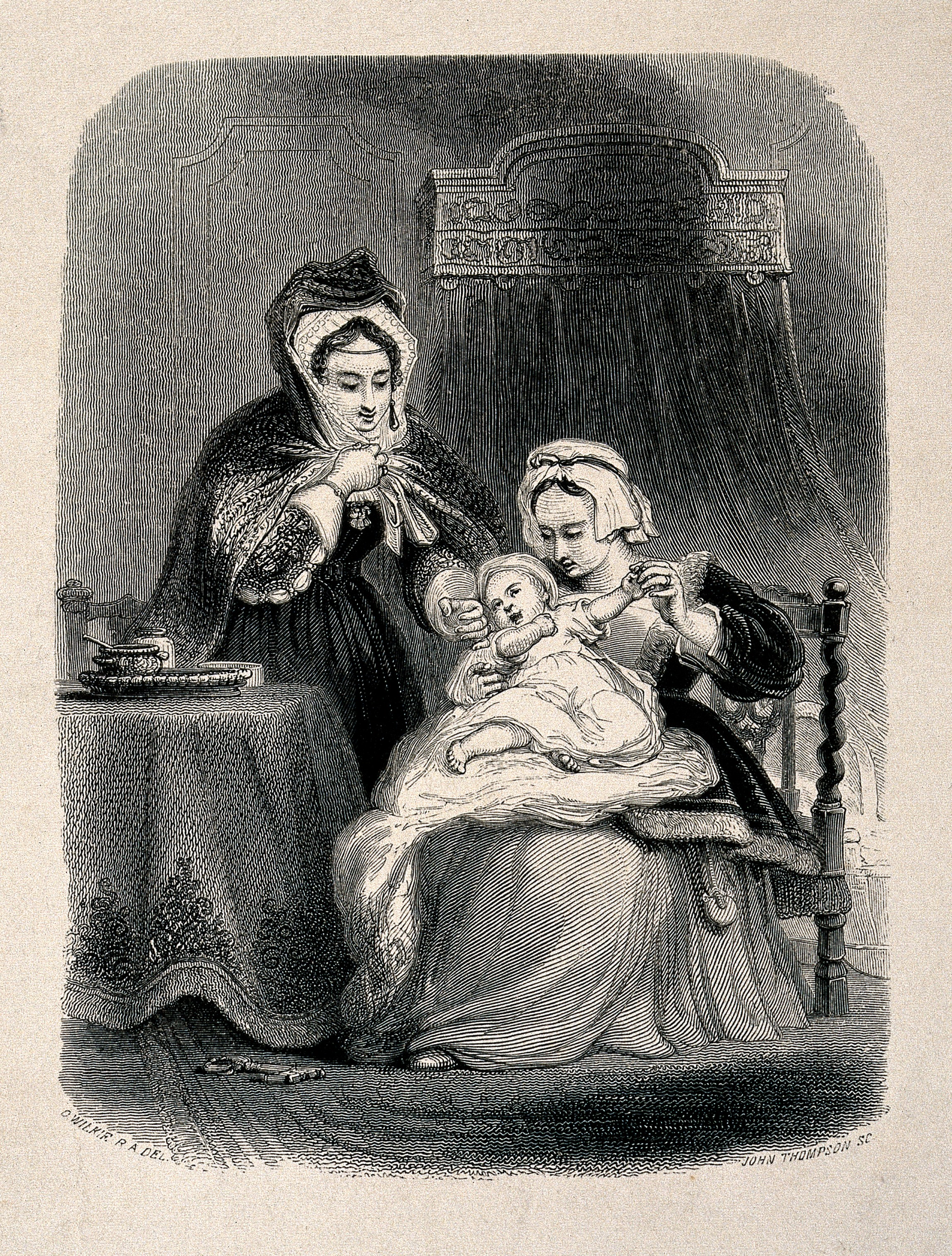
- Care work refers to activities that meet the physical, emotional, and developmental needs of others and to feelings of affection, concern, or responsibility toward those receiving care.

Care work refers to activities that meet the physical, emotional, and developmental needs of others and to feelings of affection, concern, or responsibility toward those receiving care. It may be performed for pay or without remuneration and takes place both within households and through institutions such as schools, hospitals, and child care centers. Paid care occurs in formal employment settings, while unpaid care is typically carried out within families and communities, and households often combine both forms. Care work may be direct, involving face-to-face interaction, or indirect, consisting of tasks that sustain the conditions under which care is provided.

Efforts to value unpaid care seek to assign it a monetary estimate for inclusion in national accounts, often using opportunity cost or market replacement cost methods, while recognizing that monetary measures do not fully capture care's social and relational dimensions. Empirical research measures unpaid care primarily through time-use data, usually distinguishing between housework and child care. Paid care work is typically identified through occupational classifications that group together jobs centered on person-to-person services contributing to recipients' well-being or development.

Women perform a disproportionate share of unpaid care work. The International Labour Organization estimated in 2018 that unpaid care work accounted for 16.4 billion hours each day across 64 countries representing two-thirds of the world's working-age population, with women performing 76.2 percent of those hours. This unequal distribution is associated with the "double burden", in which women combine paid employment with primary responsibility for unpaid domestic work, and with the "care penalty", which refers to lower lifetime earnings linked to caregiving responsibilities. Demographic change and shifts in work and family life have contributed to what has been described as a "care deficit".

Women are also overrepresented in many paid care occupations and face a care wage penalty in the form of lower pay relative to other jobs requiring comparable skills. Racial and immigration inequalities also exist within the care workforce, including the concentration of immigrant women and women of color in lower-paid and less protected care jobs.

Public policy debates address care work through efforts to reduce unpaid care burdens and to strengthen labor protections and compensation in paid care sectors.

== Conceptualization of care ==
=== Dual meaning of care ===
Care has been described as having a dual meaning. It refers both to concrete activities that meet the physical, emotional, and developmental needs of others and to feelings of affection, concern, or responsibility toward those receiving care. Caring feelings are often assumed to motivate caring activities, and effective care is commonly understood to involve recipients feeling emotionally supported as well as materially assisted. This distinction separates caring activities (the labor performed) from caring feelings (the emotional motivations associated with that labor). The dual meaning complicates economic analysis because care work may be motivated by intrinsic attachment while also producing socially and economically valuable outcomes in households and markets. Clarifying the difference between caring labor and caring affect informs debates about compensation and the valuation of care.

=== Care as relational process ===
Care has also been conceptualized as a relational process. Within a nurturance framework, care is understood as work directed toward sustaining and developing people through ongoing social relationships rather than as a series of isolated tasks. It is described as inherently relational, involving interaction between caregivers and recipients within broader structures of gender, race, and class. One influential formulation distinguishes four phases of care as "caring about" (recognizing need), "taking care of" (assuming responsibility), "caregiving" (providing direct care), and "care-receiving" (the response of the recipient). Care has also been defined as the combination of affection, responsibility, and responsive action within a face-to-face relationship.

=== Reproductive labor and social reproduction ===
Reproductive labor refers to the work necessary to ensure the daily maintenance and long-term reproduction of the labor force. It includes activities that sustain workers on a day-to-day basis and support the upbringing of future generations. Social reproduction is a related concept encompassing the mental, manual, and emotional work required to maintain life and reproduce the next generation within households and communities. The reproductive labor framework captures a broader universe of activities than the nurturance framework by emphasizing its structural role in sustaining economic systems.

While unpaid care work is not inherently biological, certain aspects of reproductive labor, most notably gestation, are linked to biological capacities. Debra Satz describes reproductive labor as "a special kind of labor" encompassing pregnancy, childbirth, and the raising and care of children, kin, and community members, and argues that it should not be treated according to ordinary market norms. Although gestation and childbirth rely on the capacity for pregnancy, feminist scholarship emphasizes that the expectation that women assume primary responsibility for reproductive labor is shaped by social norms and power relations rather than biological necessity.

== Types of care work ==
=== Paid and unpaid care ===
Care work may be performed for pay or without remuneration and takes place both within households and through market institutions such as schools, hospitals, and child care centers. Paid care includes services provided in formal employment settings, while unpaid care is typically carried out within families and communities. Care work occurs in both homes and markets, and the boundary between the two spheres is often fluid, as families may substitute paid care services for unpaid care labor or combine both forms. Paid and unpaid care are both substitutable and complementary, with households shifting between market-based services and unpaid labor depending on institutional and economic conditions. Women perform a disproportionate share of unpaid care work and are also overrepresented in many paid care occupations.

Unpaid care work is commonly defined as care provided for family members without direct monetary compensation, but it also includes other unpaid productive activities such as growing food for own consumption and collecting water and fuel. Within unpaid household labor, scholars often distinguish between housework and child care as two major categories. Housework includes activities such as cooking, cleaning, laundry, and household management, while child care involves direct and indirect care of children. Unpaid care and domestic work sustain households and support the reproduction of the labor force across generations.

=== Direct and indirect care ===
Care work is often distinguished between direct and indirect forms. Direct care involves face-to-face interaction with care recipients and includes activities such as feeding, bathing, teaching, counseling, and providing emotional support. Indirect care refers to activities that maintain the environment in which care is provided, such as cooking, cleaning, laundry, scheduling, and organizing household routines.

Scholars also distinguish between active and passive forms of care. Active care involves direct participation in caregiving tasks, while passive care includes supervisory presence or being "on call" to respond to a child's or dependent person's needs. Supervisory care, even when it does not involve continuous hands-on activity, can constrain caregivers' ability to participate fully in paid employment or other activities.

=== Interactive and support care ===
Care work is also differentiated between interactive and support forms. Interactive care workers provide direct, relational services to recipients, including activities such as teaching, nursing, counseling, and hands-on personal assistance. Care support workers sustain care institutions and households through tasks that make care provision possible but do not necessarily involve direct interaction with recipients. Household support care includes activities such as cooking, cleaning, and shopping, while social support care may include volunteer and community-based activities that assist vulnerable populations. Supervisory care responsibilities, including being "on call" to respond to needs, may accompany both interactive and support roles. Care work has also been described as a subset of interactive service work, reflecting its emphasis on person-centered services within broader service-sector employment.

== History ==
Before the Industrial Revolution, care work (such as taking care of the household and raising children) was performed by the family and often involved the contributions of a community. The core sphere was not seen as separate from daily business interactions, because the concept of the market did not yet exist.

With the dawn of the industrial era, the core sphere became separate from jobs and business which were performed away from the home; men left home to work in factories and at other non-domestic jobs. Women, considered better suited to nurturing, were expected to provide child care and do housework. This familial hierarchy persisted in the American family with a breadwinner father, a homemaker mother, and their children. Not all families, however, were like this. Unlike white women, Black women and women of color were expected to work; almost 80 percent of single black women, compared to 23.8 percent of single white women, worked outside the home in 1880. The labor-participation rate of white women fell after marriage; labor-force participation remained stable for Black women, and Black men and women both contributed financially to the household.

Domestic work became an important element in a stable workforce. With the abolition of slavery in the United States, Black women were increasingly hired as domestic workers. The history of domestic work in the United States is one of gender, race, citizenship, and class hierarchies. Although domestic work was a paid job, it was not recognized as such by the law or society. Because domestic work is in the private sphere and typically performed by women, it was often depicted as an "act of love" or rewarding in itself. This has been used to justify the lack of legal protection of domestic work, such as in the exclusion of domestic workers from the National Labor Relations Act guaranteeing the right to form labor unions. "Live-in" workers, such as nannies and housekeepers, do not have overtime protection under the Fair Labor Standards Act. Whether women worked or stayed in the home, their duties were believed to be unimportant and were largely ignored.

Work performed in the home often has a considerable replacement cost, but is not factored into productivity; paying others to perform care work is often prohibitively expensive. It is more cost-effective for families to substitute their time for the replacement cost. Paid care work is considered employment, but work done by family members is not counted as productive in the market and is overlooked when determining employment status.

More women participate in the labor force (at least part-time) than they did a century ago, and many believe that the "cult of domesticity" for women of the 19th and 20th centuries is obsolete. Women dominate caring professions such as teaching, child care, nursing, and social work, and most of these professions pay considerably less than jobs more frequently held by men. Women working outside the home are frequently still also expected to do housework and raise the children. Care work is still considered economically unimportant, and women have difficulty escaping gender roles.

== Theoretical frameworks ==
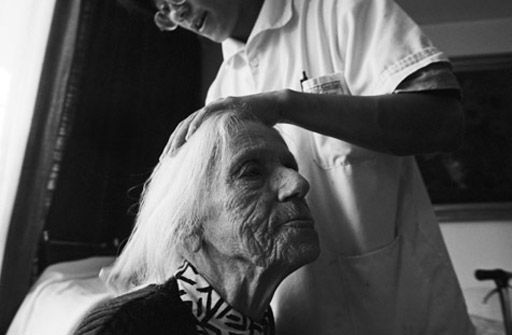
Care work

Over the past several decades, an interdisciplinary body of scholarship, particularly in sociology and feminist economics, has examined the organization and valuation of care work in both households and labor markets. This literature documents that women perform a disproportionate share of both paid and unpaid care work, and analyzes how this distribution relates to patterns of gender inequality in wages and state policy. There are five conceptual frameworks that have been developed to explain the economic, social, and moral dimensions of care work.

=== Devaluation framework ===
Devaluation framework seeks to explain the low wages typical of care work by focusing on the fact that many care workers are women, and sexism persists. Decision-makers underestimate the contribution of female-dominated jobs to organizational goals (including profits), and underpay these workers. In 2002, sociologist Paula England conducted a study that revealed, after controlling for skill demands, educational requirements, industry, and gender, a net penalty of five to 10 percent for working in an occupation involving care; one exception was nursing, which did not seem to experience the pay penalty of other care work.

=== Public good framework ===
The public good framework conceptualizes care work as generating indirect social benefits that extend beyond the direct recipient, resembling public goods in economic theory; goods with benefits that are impossible to deny to those who have not paid for them. Education, an example of care work, is often cited as an example of a public good. Care work is unique in the category of public goods in that receiving care helps recipients develop skills, values, and habits that benefit themselves and others. This theory may explain the low wages characteristic of care work. The standard economic argument is that public goods will be under-provided by markets because there is no way to capture (and turn into profits) benefits of social interaction.

=== Prisoner of love framework ===
The "prisoner of love" framework emphasizes that care work often involves services based on sustained personal interaction, and is motivated (at least in part) by concern about the recipient's welfare. This understanding affects the nature and wages of care work. If care workers are motivated by the intrinsic value of their work, economic theory holds that they will tolerate lower wages for their work. The connection these workers feel to their work places them in a poor bargaining position. However, scholars argue that this explanation is insufficient to account for the persistently low wages in care work, emphasizing instead structural and gender-based inequalities in the labor market.

=== Commodification of emotion framework ===
The commodification of emotion framework examines how the marketization of care work may affect workers' experiences and well-being. It holds that many jobs in the service economy require workers to display emotions they do not feel, which is harmful to them. The perspective is associated with Arlie Russell Hochschild, who introduced the concept of "emotional labor" to describe jobs that require workers to display emotions they may not genuinely feel. Some service jobs require "deep acting", in which workers attempt to internalize prescribed emotions, which may produce psychological strain. There is mixed evidence regarding whether emotional labor reduces job satisfaction or mental health.

=== Love-and-money framework ===
The "love-and-money" theory attempts to reconcile the perceived divide between work done for intrinsic motivation and work done for pay. Theorists assert that because men and women are seen as opposites and gender governs thinking, a dualistic view develops that "women, love, altruism, and the family are, as a group, radically separate and opposite from men, self-interested rationality, work, and market exchange." This belief has led to the idea that care work should not be performed for pay because pay will undermine the intrinsic motivations for this work; however, studies have shown that these divides may not be so stark. It has been found that acknowledging rewards sends the message that the recipient is trusted, respected, and appreciated. These results suggest that the more that pay is combined with trust and appreciation, the less it drives out genuine intrinsic motivation (especially important in care work). Theorists believe that the central problem with care work is under-demand, and it should be better compensated by the market.

== Measurement of care work ==
=== Time-use surveys ===
The most commonly used method for measuring unpaid care and domestic labor is through time-use surveys. These surveys collect information on how individuals allocate their time over a 24-hour period, typically using diary-based methods that record time spent in paid employment, unpaid household labor, caregiving, and other activities. Time-use data are used to estimate the distribution of unpaid domestic work within households and across populations.

National and cross-national time-use surveys consistently show that women spend more time than men on unpaid care work. For example, time-use research in Guatemala found that women performed approximately 70 percent of unpaid domestic labor within households. Studies using Chinese time-use data report similar gender disparities, with women spending substantially more time on unpaid household work than men. Time-series data compiled by the United Nations Statistics Division across multiple countries also indicate persistent gender gaps in the allocation of unpaid household labor worldwide.

While time-use surveys record time spent in paid employment, paid care work is more commonly measured through labor force surveys and occupational classifications that identify care-related jobs in market settings.

=== Operationalization of unpaid care work in empirical research ===
Empirical research typically operationalizes unpaid care work using time-use data, most commonly distinguishing among housework, direct child care, and supervisory care. Studies based on time diaries, such as the American Time Use Survey (ATUS) and earlier national time-use surveys, measure housework as routine domestic tasks including cooking, cleaning, laundry, and meal preparation, and sometimes distinguish these from nonroutine tasks such as home repairs and yard work. Direct child care is generally defined as time spent in face-to-face activities with children, including physical care, developmental activities, and supervision during structured interaction. In addition to activity-based measures, scholars distinguish responsibility-based measures, which capture supervisory or "on-call" time when an adult is responsible for a child but not necessarily engaged in a specific child-focused activity. This distinction between activity-based and responsibility-based care is central to debates about how unpaid care should be conceptualized and measured. Comparative and longitudinal analyses use these operational definitions to examine trends in the gender division of housework and child care across cohorts and countries. These approaches define unpaid care work empirically as time devoted to domestic labor and child-related activities, while also recognizing that responsibility for dependents may extend beyond observable task performance.

=== Operationalization of paid care work in empirical research ===
Empirical research typically operationalizes paid care work by identifying care occupations based on face-to-face service provision that contributes to the well-being or development of recipients. Using occupational classification systems such as United States census or labor force categories, scholars group together jobs including child care workers, teachers, nurses, home health aides, and therapists, on the basis that these occupations provide direct, person-centered services. This definition distinguishes care work from broader categories of interactive service work, which may also involve face-to-face interaction but do not primarily involve meeting recipients' physical, emotional, or developmental needs. Some studies further differentiate between interactive care workers, who provide direct relational services, and care support workers, who sustain care institutions through administrative, cleaning, or food service roles. These operational definitions are used in quantitative analyses to examine wage levels, occupational segregation, and employment conditions within the paid care sector.

== Valuation of care work ==
=== Methods of valuation ===
The valuation of nonmarket housework and care work refers to efforts to assign a monetary value to domestic and caregiving activities that are not exchanged in markets, such as housekeeping, cooking, cleaning, child care, and elder care. Although these activities are not included in conventional GDP measures, they are widely recognized as having economic and social importance. Valuation approaches are typically grouped into the opportunity cost method and the market replacement cost method.

==== Opportunity cost method ====
The opportunity cost method values unpaid domestic work by estimating the earnings caregivers forgo by not participating in paid employment. Under this approach, an hour of unpaid care is assigned the wage the individual could earn in the labor market. However, two caregivers performing identical tasks may be assigned different monetary values based on education, occupation, or labor market experience. The method also presents difficulties when applied to individuals without prior labor market attachment.

==== Market replacement cost method ====
The market replacement cost method estimates the value of unpaid domestic work by calculating the cost of hiring someone to provide equivalent services in the market. For example, unpaid child care may be valued at the wage of a nanny or child care worker. Replacement-cost approaches are widely used in care-sector accounting and national income adjustments. Critiques of this method note that it does not account for qualitative differences between unpaid family care and paid services, nor does it fully capture relational or emotional dimensions of caregiving.

Input/output cost method

The input/output cost method measures the value of unpaid domestic work by estimating the market value of goods and services produced within households and the prices those outputs would command in open markets. While this approach focuses on production outcomes rather than time inputs, it is often limited by data availability and by the difficulty of isolating household outputs for valuation.

==== Tracking measures ====
Traditional measures such as GDP exclude most nonmarket household activity. To address this omission, statistical agencies and researchers have developed satellite accounts and alternative indicators.

===== Gross domestic product adjustments =====
In 2012, the United States Bureau of Economic Analysis created an adjusted GDP measure incorporating household production using time-use survey data. The inclusion of nonmarket household production increased measured GDP by 39 percent in 1965 and 26 percent in 2010.

===== Genuine progress indicator =====
The Genuine progress indicator (GPI) incorporates environmental and social factors into measures of economic performance, including the value of unpaid household work and parenting. GPI calculations often assign replacement values to unpaid labor and treat household production as a component of social infrastructure.

===== Gross household product =====
Gross household product (GHP) estimates the economic value added by unpaid household labor and capital and is sometimes presented alongside GDP to capture both market and nonmarket production.

Monetary valuation can show the scale of unpaid care work's contribution to economic output. However, scholars note that monetary value is not the same as social value. Monetary estimates show what it would cost to replace unpaid labor or the income that is forgone, but they do not fully reflect the social, relational, and intergenerational importance of care.

=== Unremunerated care ===
The Unremunerated Work Act of 1991 proposed requiring the Bureau of Labor Statistics to conduct surveys measuring unpaid labor and to incorporate such estimates into the GDP. Although the bill did not pass, it prompted the Bureau of Labor Statistics to begin examining the measurement of unpaid work and contributed to the eventual development of the American Time Use Survey as a key data source for capturing unpaid labor in the United States. The proposal was supported by many feminist economists who argued that unpaid care and domestic work underpin the functioning of the formal economy. Critics contended that formal valuation might romanticize care work or reinforce gender divisions of labor. They also expressed concern that market-based approaches to care may lead to activities being performed in a mechanical or impersonal manner, potentially crowding out caring motivations and overlooking the relational and qualitative aspects of care.

Accounting for unpaid care presents methodological challenges. Care activities are often emotionally embedded and frequently performed simultaneously with other tasks. Survey respondents may exhibit "social-desirability bias", reporting more time spent in care than other household members would attribute to them. Time-use diaries, in which individuals record activities performed during the previous day, are widely used to reduce recall and reporting bias and to standardize estimates across populations.

Care-sector accounting frameworks measure care provision across paid, unpaid, and publicly funded spheres, and estimates of the economic scale of unremunerated care work vary widely depending on measurement assumptions and valuation methods. Recent global estimates suggest that unpaid care work represents a substantial share of economic activity: the International Labour Organization estimates that unpaid care work would be valued at approximately 9 percent of global GDP if compensated at minimum wage. One analysis estimated that the care sector accounts for approximately 39.4 percent of care-inclusive GDP when market and nonmarket care activities are combined. Related estimates incorporating household production into national accounts suggest that nonmarket household production may amount to roughly one-quarter of economic output in the United States. These estimates depend on assumptions regarding wage rates and valuation techniques, highlighting the sensitivity of monetary calculations.

=== Relationship to the economy and the paid labor market ===
Unpaid care labor is widely described as key to the functioning of market economies. According to Henderson's Cake Model, reproductive and care labor are essential to sustaining economic systems.

Care labor contributes to the development and maintenance of human capital, defined as the skills, knowledge, and health embodied in individuals that enhance productivity. Since unpaid care work is disproportionately performed by women, the labor that sustains human capital formation is often undervalued relative to financial capital.

As dual-earner households have become more common, some forms of care and domestic labor have become marketized. Activities such as cooking, cleaning, and child care are increasingly performed by paid workers, including domestic workers and day-care staff. Paid care workers are frequently employed under relatively low wages and poor conditions. Scholars have described this pattern as a "care penalty", referring to the lower wages and status associated with care occupations relative to other jobs requiring comparable skill levels.

== Care, gender, and inequality ==
=== Gender division of care work ===
The gender division of care work refers to the persistent pattern in which women perform a disproportionate share of unpaid care work across societies. Comparative research consistently shows that women provide the majority of unpaid child care and domestic work. Globally, women are estimated to perform approximately 76 percent of unpaid care work, spending on average more than three times as many hours on unpaid care activities as men. International time-use data indicate that, across regions, women perform roughly two and a half times more unpaid care and domestic work than men.

==== Historical and social foundations ====
The gendered allocation of care responsibilities is widely understood as socially constructed. Nineteenth-century ideologies about "separate spheres" placed women in the private sphere of family and caregiving, while linking men to paid work in the public sphere. These norms were reinforced through religious, colonial, and imperial institutions that promoted domesticity as central to femininity. Scholars have emphasized that gender roles are reproduced through socialization processes that encourage women to assume relational and caregiving identities, while men are associated with breadwinning and financial provision.

==== Globalization and changing labor patterns ====
Since the mid-twentieth century, increased female labor force participation and globalization have expanded women's access to paid employment. However, entry into paid work has not eliminated women's primary responsibility for unpaid care. Research indicates that women who engage in full-time employment often continue to perform the majority of household and caregiving tasks.

Scholars have linked stalled progress in closing gender wage gaps in many high-income countries to the continued unequal distribution of unpaid care responsibilities. In dual-earner households, women's unpaid work may result in part-time employment, career interruptions, or reduced working hours, contributing to cumulative differences in earnings and retirement income.

The rise of dual-earner households and demographic aging has increased demand for care services, contributing to the marketization of certain forms of domestic labor, including paid child care and cleaning services. Nonetheless, unpaid care responsibilities remain unequally distributed within households.

=== Double burden ===
A double burden, also known as a "double day" or "second shift", refers to a situation in which women take part in paid employment while also carrying out most unpaid domestic and caregiving work in the household. Sociologist Arlie Russell Hochschild popularized the concept in The Second Shift, where she described how many women in dual-earner households perform a "second shift" of housework and child care after completing their paid workday. The phenomenon is linked to persistent gender norms that place primary responsibility for domestic work on women, even when partners work similar hours in paid employment.

Time-use research shows that increases in women's participation in paid employment have not been matched by similar declines in their unpaid work hours. As a result, women often face longer total work hours than men. Studies link the double burden to higher levels of stress, greater work–family conflict, and lower life satisfaction. According to the Human Development Report (2015), across 63 countries women spent approximately 31 percent of their time engaged in unpaid work compared with 10 percent for men.

=== Care penalty and economic inequality ===
The "care penalty" refers to the economic and social disadvantages associated with performing care work, whether unpaid or paid. These disadvantages include lower earnings, fewer opportunities for career advancement, lost work experience, reduced pension savings, and less personal time. Care work may limit a person's ability to compete in labor markets with others who do not have similar responsibilities.

==== Unpaid care work ====
One of the most widely documented forms of the care penalty is the motherhood penalty. Mothers who interrupt employment, reduce hours, or shift to part-time work to provide child care often experience long-term reductions in lifetime earnings. Feminist economist Nancy Folbre describes this cumulative disadvantage as the "family gap" or "motherhood gap".

Although parenthood is the most common source of the care penalty, elder care can create similar costs. Adult children often take on responsibility for aging parents, particularly where public services are limited. Research shows that caring for elderly family members is linked to lost employment opportunities as well as higher levels of stress and depression, and these responsibilities often fall disproportionately on women due to social norms.

==== Paid care work ====
Workers in paid care occupations experience what is often described as a "care wage penalty". Occupations involving face-to-face services that develop recipients' capabilities, such as teaching, nursing, and child care, tend to pay less than other occupations requiring comparable education and skill. Since women are disproportionately employed in these occupations, this wage penalty contributes to broader gender wage gaps.

One explanation for this penalty is the cultural devaluation of work linked to women. Caring labor has historically been associated with femininity and motherhood, and work connected to women is often undervalued in wage-setting processes. Another explanation focuses on the public-good features of care work. Care provision supports the development of human capabilities and social cohesion, creating benefits that extend beyond the immediate recipients of care. However, because these benefits are widely shared and difficult to measure, market wages may not fully reflect the social value of care work.

Research led by Daniel Oerther used a reverse approach; hypothesizing the presence of a care wage penalty is an indicator that a profession is a caring occupation. Environmental engineering, with a near equal gender parity among bacclaureate graduates has lower-median-salary status despite high educational attainment.

=== Care deficit and demographic change ===
The term "care deficit" refers to a gap between the demand for care and the supply of caregivers. It is often linked to demographic change and shifts in work and family life. The concept has been used to describe tensions that arise when women's increased participation in paid employment reduces the time available for unpaid care within households. Scholars have cautioned that describing this change as simple "outsourcing" from families to markets overlooks the long history of both paid and unpaid care work existing side by side, as well as the complex history of care provision. Care needs have also grown over time due to longer life expectancy, lower fertility rates, and changing expectations about the quality and intensity of care across the life course.

Population aging and changes in health care organization have led to significant growth in paid care jobs in the United States. During the twentieth century, the paid care sector expanded to include health care, long-term care, child care, education, and social services. This growth has included both professional positions and many low-wage support roles. These patterns reflect institutional changes and efforts to control costs within care industries. Despite the expansion of market-based services, unpaid family members continue to provide a large share of care. As a result, care systems often combine family, state, and market actors.

=== Racial and class stratification in care work ===
Research on care work describes a racial division of reproductive labor in which women of color and immigrant women are disproportionately represented in low-paid and insecure care occupations. In the United States, domestic service, child care, and other forms of paid reproductive labor developed within racial hierarchies that placed the lowest-paid and least protected care work on Black women and other women of color. These patterns continue in contemporary labor markets, as reproductive labor is distributed along lines of race, class, and citizenship status.

The expansion of paid care sectors, such as home health care, nursing assistance, and domestic work, has been accompanied by clear divisions within care occupations. More professionalized care roles are more often held by white and middle-class workers. Lower-wage positions, which often involve informal work arrangements and limited labor protections, are more likely to be filled by immigrant women and women of color. These patterns reflect broader inequalities in the labor market and contribute to ongoing wage gaps and occupational segregation within the care economy.

Transnational migration has also changed how care work is organized. Households in high-income countries increasingly depend on migrant domestic workers to meet care needs. This pattern has been conceptualized as part of global care chains, in which care labor is transferred across national boundaries as migrant workers provide care in wealthier households while leaving care responsibilities in their own families to others. Inequalities in wealth, citizenship, and social status shape who performs care work, the conditions under which it is carried out, and the level of economic and social recognition it receives.

== Care work and public policy ==
Public policy debates distinguish between unpaid care work performed within households and paid care work performed in labor markets. The following section summarizes policy solutions proposed by scholars and experts.

=== Unpaid care work and public policy ===
Public policy discussions on unpaid care work focus on recognizing, reducing, and redistributing unpaid care work, improving data collection at the national and state levels, investing in public infrastructure, expanding subsidized child care and elder care services, promoting access to non-fossil fuel energy sources, implementing family-friendly workplace policies, and public investment and care provision.

==== Recognize, reduce, and redistribute ====
The "Recognize, Reduce, and Redistribute" framework proposes that achieving gender equality requires recognizing unpaid care work in national statistics and policy design, reducing the time burden associated with it through investment in physical and social infrastructure, and redistributing remaining responsibilities more equally between women and men. Recognition includes the use of time-use surveys and valuation methods, such as replacement cost approaches, to estimate its economic contribution. Reduction includes investment in water, sanitation, energy, child care, elder care, and health care services, which lower household labor burdens. Redistribution includes policies such as paid parental leave for fathers, non-transferable leave quotas, flexible work arrangements, and shorter standard workweeks.

==== Data collection at the national and state level ====
The quality and availability of data at the micro and macro levels is an area in need of improvement for the purpose of studying how policies impact the division of labor within households and for calculating the value unpaid labor. Organizations such as the United Nations Statistics Division capture quantitative data on the number of hours women and men spend on paid, unpaid and total work hours. Collecting more qualitative data would be useful for determining how to calculate the value of unpaid labor, particularly for the market replacement cost method.

==== Subsidized care services and public provision ====
Public provision and subsidization of care services are central policy approaches to addressing unpaid care work. Ensuring access to affordable child care and elder care services can reduce household care burdens while supporting fair compensation for care workers. International policy frameworks such as the United Nations Sustainable Development Goal 5 emphasize the importance of public services, infrastructure, and social protection in recognizing and supporting unpaid work. At the same time, unpaid care work has fiscal implications, as it can function as an indirect subsidy to public budgets when households provide services that would otherwise require public expenditure. Reductions in public spending on care services can shift responsibilities back to households, disproportionately affecting women and increasing economic vulnerability, particularly during periods of austerity.

==== Family-friendly workplace policies ====
Policies such as shorter work weeks, flexible paid leave, flextime, and remote work are often proposed as ways to support a more equal distribution of unpaid care work within households. Philosopher and feminist Nancy Fraser has argued that in two-partner households, a reduced work week can promote greater gender equality. At the same time, policymakers are encouraged to consider a range of household structures, including single-parent households, to avoid increasing economic vulnerability.

==== Investment in public infrastructure and energy ====
Public investment in infrastructure and energy can reduce the burden of unpaid care work, particularly in developing countries, by lowering the time required for essential household tasks. Improved access to resources such as water has been shown to reduce time spent on unpaid labor, even when it does not significantly increase women's participation in paid work. Access to modern energy sources similarly affects care work by reducing time spent collecting fuel and improving household conditions. Policies that promote renewable energy and alternatives such as biogas can decrease time burdens associated with fuel collection while also reducing indoor air pollution.

=== Paid care work and public policy ===
Public policy discussions on paid care work focus on strengthening labor standards and worker protections, reforming public financing and reimbursement structures, addressing racial and immigration inequalities within the care sector, and promoting training and professional development of the care workforce.

==== Labor standards and workforce inequality ====
Domestic and home-based care workers were historically excluded from major labor protections in the United States, including minimum wage and overtime rules, contributing to economic insecurity among parts of the care workforce. Paid care work is also stratified by race, ethnicity, and immigration status, with immigrant women and women of color often concentrated in lower-paid segments of the sector. In response, some jurisdictions have adopted reforms extending labor protections to domestic and home care workers, alongside efforts to strengthen enforcement and regulate employment practices to address disparities within the care workforce.

==== Public financing and workforce development ====
Many paid care services depend on public funding, including Medicaid reimbursements and child care subsidies, and low reimbursement rates can constrain wages and staffing levels in the sector. As a result, proposals to increase public investment in care services are often linked to improving pay and job stability. Some scholars also advocate for the professionalization of the care workforce through formal training and credentialing systems, which are presented as ways to raise occupational status and improve working conditions, though their effects vary across care sectors.

== See also ==
- Unpaid work
- Reproductive labor
- Social reproduction
- Feminist economics
- Emotional labor
- Invisible labor
- Double burden
- Work–family balance in the United States
- Global care chain
- Motherhood penalty
- Time-use survey
