= Anne-Marie Devreux =

French sociologist

Anne-Marie Devreux (born 1952) is a French sociologist specializing in feminism and the sociology of gender relations. Noting that women are both under-represented as scientists and as objects of study, she has criticized science as androcentric. In 2017 she was made a Chevalier of the French Legion of Honor.

== Biographical information ==
Born in 1952, Devreux became a researcher at the Centre d'Anthropologie, d'Économie et de Sociologie, Applications et Recherches, CAESAR, in the Research Team of the University of Paris-Nanterre, from 1980 to 1984. Then from 1989 to 1992, she was an associate researcher at the Centre de Sociologie de la Défense Nationale (CSDN), at the Ministry of Defense, then at the Centre de Sociologie Urbaine (CSU).

She holds the position of research director at the CNRS, attached to CRESPPA, Centre de recherches sociologiques et politiques de Paris, CSU (Cultures and Urban Societies) team.

From 2010 to 2013, she led the Multidisciplinary Thematic Network (MNT) Gender Studies. This MNT initiates interdisciplinarity between social sciences and hard sciences, introducing gender studies in three scientific fields (medicine and health, ecology and environment, engineering and technology), in France. This research programme resulted in a book published in 2016, Les sciences et le genre. Together with Françoise Moos, Devreux is also scientific manager of the Défi genre de la Mission pour l'Interdisciplinarité of the CNRS.

Since 2018, she has been the scientific and organizational head of the International Congress of Feminist Research in the French-speaking World (CIRFF), which takes place at the University of Paris-Nanterre.

== Research themes ==
Devreux contributes to the development of feminist studies in France, as her research makes it possible to grasp "the contributions of gender relations to sociological conceptualization."

Devreux's work also focuses on the androcentrism of science. She considers that women are both under-represented as scientists and as objects of study and that this leads to an androcentrism of the knowledge we have. She criticized Pierre Bourdieu's "blind lucidity," which unduly poses as the "discoverer" of "the importance of the field of male domination and the role played there by systems of representation and the effects of categorization, all of which were scientifically established well before the article in the Actes de la Recherche written almost ten years before the book and which constitutes its major part."

Anne-Marie Devreux underlines the methodological impasse in ethnology and sociology if they do not go beyond the essentialist conception of sex: the feminine is the particular, the masculine is the general. She also highlights the social relationship of the sexes and the need to conceptualize them.

Together with Nadine Lefaucheur, Georges Falconnet, Daniel Welzer-Lang and Christine Castelain-Meunier, Devreux is one of the first researchers to work on masculinity.

Devreux also questions the unequal relationship between men and women in parenthood, and anti-feminism.

== Main publications ==
- 2016 - Anne-Marie Devreux (coord.), Les sciences et le genre : déjouer l’androcentrisme, Presses universitaires de Rennes, coll. « Essais ».
- 2014 - Coline Cardi et Anne-Marie Devreux (coord.) « L’engendrement du droit », Cahiers du genre, No. 57.
- 2012 - Anne-Marie Devreux et Diane Lamoureux (dir.), dossier « Les antiféminismes », Cahiers du genre, No. 52 (Numéro commun avec Recherches féministes, 2012, vol.25, No. 1.)
- 2010 - D. Chabaud, V. Descoutures, A-M. Devreux, E. Varikas (dir.), Sous les sciences sociales le genre. Relectures critiques de Max Weber à Bruno Latour, La Découverte.
- 2004 Autorité parentale et parentalité. Droits des pères et obligations des mères ?, Dialogue, n° 165, Le Kremlin-Bicêtre, 2004.

== Awards ==
She was knighted on 1 January 2017 by the Ministry of National Education, Higher Education and Research.

== See also ==
- Radical feminism
