= Svampa =

Svampa is a surname. Notable people with the surname include:

- Domenico Svampa (1851–1907), Italian Catholic archbishop
- Maristella Svampa (born 1961), Argentine sociologist
