= Lidia Cirillo =

Italian writer

Lidia Cirillo (born 24 April 1940) is an Italian writer and socialist feminist.

== Biography ==
Cirillo has been active in the feminist movement since the late 1960s and politically engaged from an early date as a socialist activist in the Italian Section of the Fourth International, Proletarian Democracy, Communist Refoundation Party (of which she was a member of the National Political Committee) and then of the Critical Left (with which she was a candidate for the Senate in the 2008 elections).

She was part of the editorial staff of Erre magazine and its precursor Bandiera rossa, and also collaborated for several years with the daily Liberazione. She has written several books on feminism and is the curator of the permanent workshop of the Quaderni viola which since the end of the eighties has been developing pamphlets and books on the theme of female emancipation. It is also active on LGBT issues.

She was one of the Italian protagonists of the World March of Women and speaker in various assemblies of the European Social Forum on feminist issues. She has also participated as a speaker in numerous editions of the youth camp of the Fourth International.

In March 2022 she was amongst 151 international feminists signing Feminist Resistance Against War: A Manifesto, in solidarity with the Russian Feminist Anti-War Resistance. (Note: This manifesto was criticized by both Ukrainian feminists and members of the Feminist Anti-War Resistance themselves.)

== Selected publications ==
- Lettera alle romane. Sussidiario per una scuola dell'obbligo di femminismo, 2001, Quaderni Viola, Edizioni Il Dito e la Luna
- La luna severa maestra. Il contributo del femminismo ai movimenti sociali e alla costruzione dell'alternativa, 2003, Milano, Quaderni Viola, Edizioni Il Dito e la Luna
- Da Vladimir Ilich a Vladimir Luxuria. Soggetti di liberazione, rivoluzioni e potere, 2007, Roma, Edizioni Alegre, ISBN 9788889772003
- Lavorare stanca. Statistiche, ricerche, bibliografie e ragionamenti sul lavoro delle donne, 2008, Roma, Quaderni viola Edizioni Alegre
- Il movimento delle lesbiche in Italia, 2008, Milano, Edizioni Il dito e la Luna
- La straniera. Informazioni, sito-bibliografie e ragionamenti su razzismo e sessismo, 2009, Roma, Quaderni viola Edizioni Alegre, ISBN 9788889772409
- Orgoglio e pregiudizio. Le lesbiche in Italia nel 2010: politica, storia, teoria, immaginari, 2010, Roma, Quaderni viola Edizioni Alegre, ISBN 9788889772539
- L'emancipazione malata. Sguardi femministi sul lavoro che cambia, 2010, Milano, Edizione Libera Università delle Donne.
- Sebben che siamo donne. Femminismo e lotta sindacale nella crisi, 2011, Roma, Quaderni Viola, Edizioni Alegre, ISBN 9788889772690
- Lotta di classe sul palcoscenico. I teatri occupati si raccontano, 2014, Roma, Edizioni Alegre, ISBN 9788889772980
- Cinzia Arruzza, Lidia Cirillo, Storia delle storie del femminismo, Alegre 2017
- Utero in affitto o Gravidanza per altri? 2017
- Se il mondo torna uomo. Le donne e la regressione in Europa, Alegre 2018
