= Debora Diniz =

Brazilian anthropologist

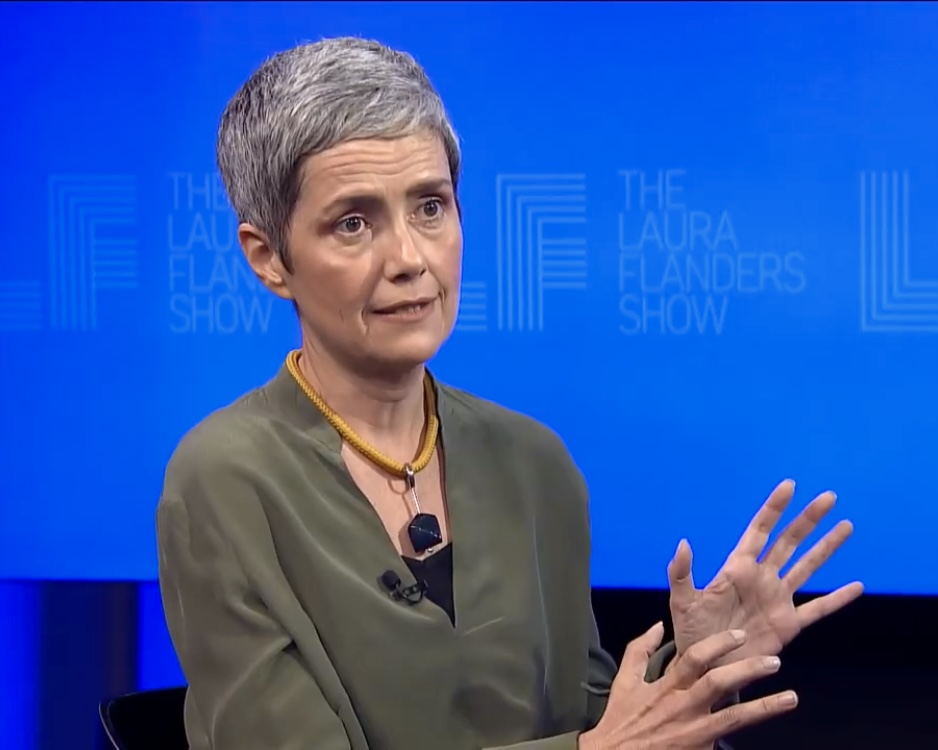
Debora Diniz interviewed on The Laura Flanders Show in 2019

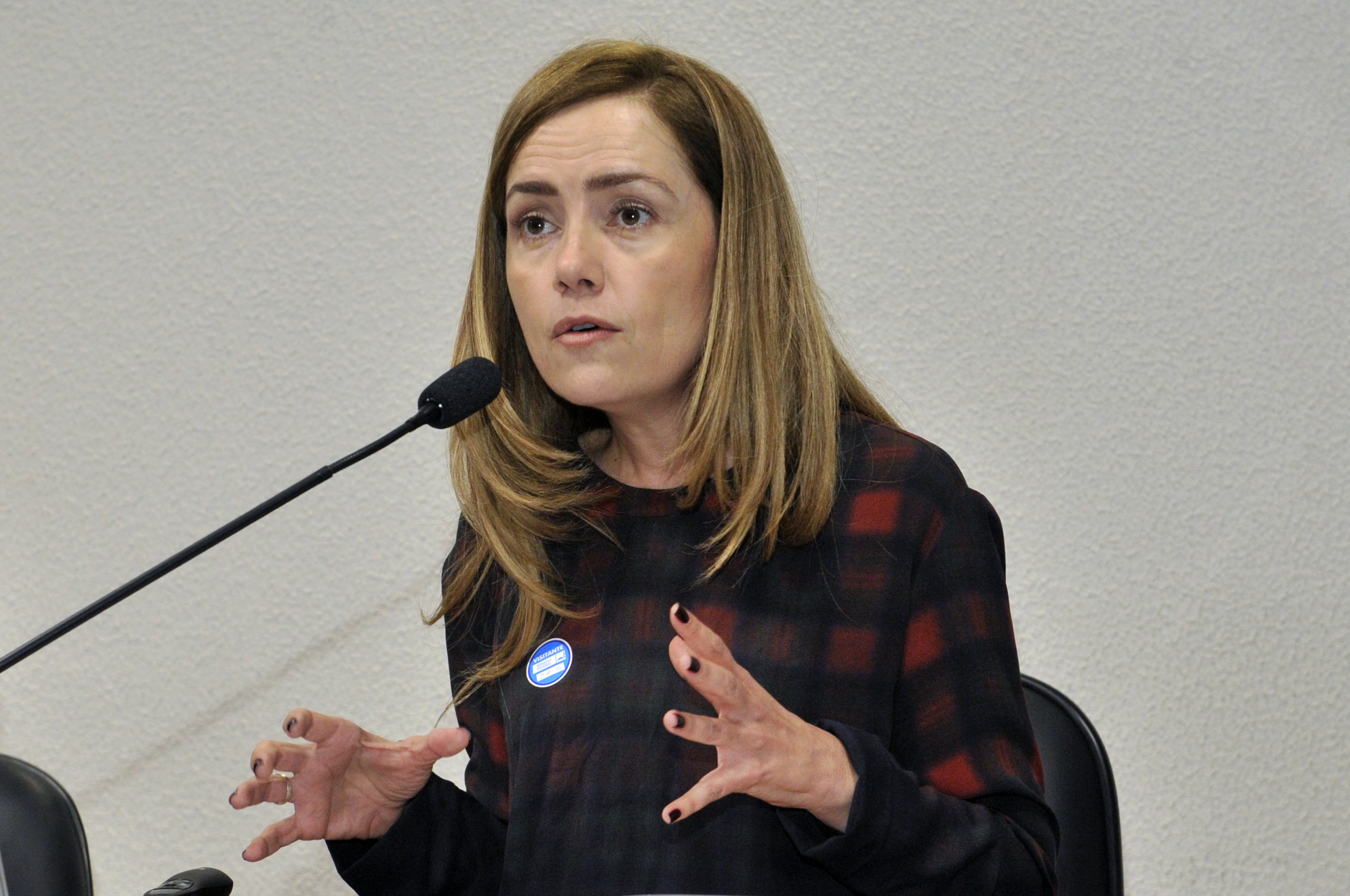
Diniz in 2015

Debora Diniz Rodrigues is a Brazilian anthropologist and law professor at the University of Brasília, and a co-founder and researcher at Anis: Institute for Bioethics. She is also a researcher, writer and documentary filmmaker. Her research projects focus on bioethics, feminism, human rights and health. She was a visiting researcher at the University of Leeds, the University of Michigan, the University of Toronto, among other institutions.

By 2016, Diniz had received about 90 awards, including scientific and academic awards for her films at festivals, including the Fred L. Soper Award for Excellence in Public Health Literature, the Pan American Health Organization, in 2012, for the publication of her National Abortion Survey. In 2020 she was honored with the Dan David Prize.

Her research found that one in five Brazilian women had an abortion by age 40.

In 2017, she published Zika: From the Brazilian Backlands to Global Threat (Zed Books).

In March 2022, she was amongst 151 international feminists signing Feminist Resistance Against War: A Manifesto, in solidarity with the Russian Feminist Anti-War Resistance. (Note: This manifesto was criticized by both Ukrainian feminists and members of the Feminist Anti-War Resistance themselves.)
