= Santa Fe, Colón =

Santa Fé Guadalupe Colon
- Municipality
- Nickname: Giriga
- Location in Honduras
- Coordinates: 15°55′N 86°2′W
- Country: Honduras
- Department: Colón

Area
  - Total: 196 km^{2} (76 sq mi)

Population (2016)
  - Total: 5,390
  - Density: 27.5/km^{2} (71.2/sq mi)

Santa Fe is a municipality in the Honduran department of Colón.

Notable people from Santa Fe include Miriam Miranda, a Honduran human rights activist who advocates for the land rights of the Garífuna people.
