= National Council for the Social Studies =

American educational association

- Abbreviation: NCSS
- Formation: 1921; 105 years ago
- Purpose: Academic/Education
- Headquarters: Silver Spring, Maryland
- President: Joe Schmidt
- Vice President: David Kendrick
- Executive Director: Kelly McFarland Stratman
- Website: socialstudies.org

The National Council for the Social Studies (NCSS) is a private, non-profit association based in Silver Spring, Maryland, that provides leadership, support, and advocacy for social studies education.

The council is affiliated with various regional or state-level social studies associations, including the Middle States Council for the Social Studies, the Washington State Council for the Social Studies, the New York City UFT Association for the Teaching of Social Studies, the Michigan Council for the Social Studies, the Massachusetts Council for the Social Studies, and the Virginia Council for the Social Studies.

The association publishes several journals. Its flagship publication, Social Education, is a peer-reviewed journal which, according to its website, aims to strike "a balance of theoretical content and practical teaching ideas." They sponsor the high school honor society Rho Kappa.

NCSS is currently a member of the National Coalition Against Censorship.

== History ==
Founded in 1921, NCSS engages and supports educators in strengthening and advocating social studies. With members in all the 50 states, Washington, D.C., and 69 foreign countries, NCSS serves as an umbrella organization for elementary, secondary, and college teachers of history, geography, economics, political science, sociology, psychology, anthropology, and law-related education. Organized into a network of more than 110 affiliated state, local, and regional councils and associated groups, the NCSS membership represents K–12 classroom teachers, college and university faculty members, curriculum designers and specialists, social studies supervisors, and leaders in the various disciplines that constitute the social studies.

== Social Studies ==
NCSS defines social studies as "the integrated study of the social sciences and humanities to promote civic competence". Within the school program, social studies provides coordinated, systematic study drawing upon such disciplines as anthropology, archaeology, economics, geography, history, law, philosophy, political science, psychology, religion, and sociology, as well as appropriate content from the humanities, mathematics, and natural sciences. In essence, social studies promotes knowledge of and involvement in civic affairs. And because civic issues—such as health care, crime, and foreign policy—are multidisciplinary in nature, understanding these issues and developing resolutions to them requires multidisciplinary education. These characteristics are the key defining aspects of social studies.

== Expectations of Excellence ==
In 2010, the council published National Curriculum Standards for Social Studies: A Framework for Teaching, Learning and Assessment. This publication is an update and revision of Expectations of Excellence: Curriculum Standards for Social Studies originally published in 1994. The National Curriculum Standards provides an articulated K–12 social studies program that serves as a framework for the integration of other national standards in social studies, including U.S. and world history, civics and government, geography, global education, and economics. NCSS standards ensure that an integrated social science, behavioral science, and humanities approach for achieving academic and civic competence is available to guide social studies decision makers in K–12 schools.

The NCSS framework consists of ten themes incorporating fields of study that correspond with one or more relevant disciplines. The organization believes that effective social studies programs include experiences that provide for the study of: Culture; Time, Continuity, and Change; People, Places, and Environments; Individual Development and Identity; Individuals, Groups, and Institutions; Power, Authority, and Governance; Production, Distribution, and Consumption; Science, Technology, and Society; Global Connections; and Civic Ideals and Practices.

== Awards ==
The NCSS gives a number of awards including:

- Outstanding Social Studies Teacher of the Year Awards –This award is given to exceptional social studies teachers K-12.
- Award for Global Understanding Given in Honor of James M. Becker. Since 2003, this award has been given in honor of James M. Becker to social studies educators who have made significant contributions to the teaching and learning of social studies.
- Fund for the Advancement of Social Studies Education (FASSE) Christa McAuliffe Reach for the Stars Award and Grant. In honor of Christa McAuliffe, this award and grant is given to educators who have a dream to make a difference in social studies education.
- NCSS Research Awards . There are three sponsored research awards- the exemplary research award, the exemplary dissertation award, distinguished career research award.
- Carter G. Woodson Book Award. The award was established in 1974 and is awarded to exemplary social science books written for young children.

== See also ==
- New England History Teachers' Association
