= Goretti Horgan =

Irish socialist activist

Goretti Horgan is an Irish socialist activist and a lecturer in social policy at Ulster University in Northern Ireland.

== Life ==
Born in Cork, Horgan was named after Maria Goretti. She attended university before moving to England. She later returned to Dublin, where she became involved in pro-choice campaigning. Before becoming a lecturer, she worked as a research fellow at the university and as a researcher for Save the Children and the National Children's Bureau. Before training as a researcher, she worked as a community worker in Derry city and County Londonderry. Before moving to Northern Ireland in 1986, she worked in television production in RTÉ in Dublin. She was Chair of the Northern Ireland Anti Poverty Network (NIAPN) from 2005–2008 and remains a member of the board of directors of NIAPN.

Horgan is also a socialist and women's rights activist, particularly known for her pro-choice campaigning. She was a member of the first Women's Right to Choose Group in Ireland in the early 1980s and a founder of the Anti Amendment Campaign – the campaign to oppose the Eighth (anti-abortion) amendment to the Irish Constitution. She was later National Organiser of the Anti Amendment Campaign. In Northern Ireland, she was a founder member of the Derry Women's Right to Choose Group and of Alliance for Choice. She is a campaigner for children's rights and for the rights of disabled people.

A member of the Socialist Workers Party since the early 1980s, her partner is Eamonn McCann the writer, journalist, and fellow socialist. They live in the Bogside in Derry with their daughter, Matty. She was the official leader of the Socialist Environmental Alliance until its dissolution in 2008.

She has been on trial, and acquitted of all charges, for anti-war activity. She was one of nine women who occupied the Raytheon facility in Derry in January 2009, during the Israeli assault on Gaza. All were charged with burglary and criminal damage but argued in court they were trying to stop Raytheon's collusion in Israeli war crimes. As part of their defence, they had to demonstrate that war crimes had been committed during "Operation Cast Lead". The jury found them not guilty.

In March 2022 she was amongst 151 international feminists signing Feminist Resistance Against War: A Manifesto, in solidarity with the Russian Feminist Anti-War Resistance. (Note: This manifesto was criticized by both Ukrainian feminists and members of the Feminist Anti-War Resistance themselves.)
