= Childbirth in China =

Childbirth in China is influenced by traditional Chinese medicine, state control of reproductive health and birthing, and the adoption of modern biomedical practices. There are an estimated 16 million births annually in mainland China. As of 2022, Chinese state media reported the country's total fertility rate to be 1.09. In 2023, there were 7.88 million births.

== Background ==
=== Chinese family structure ===
Traditional Chinese marriages were arranged by the parents of the bride and groom to create familial alliances, often through the use of a matchmaker. Wives lived with their husband's families and were subject to traditional Confucian beliefs in respecting elders. A woman's primary role was to produce sons for her husband to preserve paternal family lines. The Marriage Law of 1950 overhauled many traditional customs, banning concubinage and gave women the prerogative to choose their spouse. In 1981, the New Marriage Law continued this trend, banning arranged marriages and dowries altogether and gave women the ability to divorce.

Over the past 40 years, changing demographics, population mobility, and family planning policies have altered traditional Chinese family structures. In 2016, the average age at first marriage was 24.8 for women and 26.9 for men. Nuclear families are declining, while one-person households and, in rural areas, linear family structures increase. Social discourse over the 20th century initially called to “destroy the family unit” in order to encourage gender parity. This rhetoric was replaced by calls for women to return to the home, in order to relieve strain on the job market and encouraged involved mothering. These ideas are gradually being rejected in favor of an emphasis on women's’ choice, in both family life and employment and extending to broader social engagement. However, women continue to have less social engagement than men, and women's social engagement is dictated by marital and family status, whereas men's is driven by educational attainment and job status. In 2018, women spent an average of 15.35% of their time on unpaid domestic and care work, compared to only 5.9% for men. In 2019, 69% of women ages 15–64 participated in the labor force, compared to 83% of men, and women comprised 43.6% of the labor force.

Women receive 128 days of government-mandated paid maternity leave. Maternity leave is paid at 100% the rate of average salary in the prior year.

=== Traditional beliefs and practices ===
Traditional Chinese medicine (TCM) dates back to 2000 BC, and is rooted in the philosophies of Taoism. TCM conceptualizes the human body as a chaotic entity requiring balance and control. This balance is understood to be an equilibrium, or qi, between two opposing forces: yin and yang. Yin is the negative force, representing femininity, darkness, coldness and inferiority, while Yang is the positive force, representing masculinity, light, warmth and superiority. TCM emphasizes the importance of diet and behavior to maintain balance and prevent emotional and physical problems. Many traditional customs and restrictions are still widely practiced during pregnancy and in the postpartum period.

In early China during the Tang Dynasty (618-907 A.D.), there were processes in terms of medicinal prenatal care. Since the maintenance of balance between yin and yang was highly valued, women had to be aware of what they were putting in their body. However, it was not only women who could take natural prenatal treatments. Men could take Seven Seeds Powder, and women could take Fluorite and Asparagus Pills in tandem with a uterus-rinsing decoction. All of the ingredients in these treatments are naturally occurring, and were meant to aid in restoring balance within the body, as well as assisting in fertilization.

Traditional Chinese lay midwives, called jieshengpo, were the dominant birth attendants throughout dynastic Chinese history. Jieshengpo have been criticized since in the Song-Ming dynasty as unqualified and dangerous, as female vocations violated traditional gender roles. Male doctors from the Ming Dynasty onward emphasized hands-off approaches to childbirth, viewing it as a process which should be dictated by the birthing woman. Lay midwives remained popular until the adoption of Western biomedicine in the mid-20th century.

=== The mandate for modernity ===
Beginning in the 18th century, Enlightenment Era scientific, economic and colonial development in Europe threatened longstanding Chinese notions of superiority. The late 19th and early 20th century were marred by political and economic failures, beginning with British defeats in the Opium Wars. Widespread poverty, famine and corruption sparked a series of rebellions, culminating in the 1911 collapse of the ancient imperial government. Republican revolutionaries during the early 20th century called for modernization to preserve the future of China. In 1949, Mao Zedong founded the People's Republic of China and began solidifying his power through totalitarian control. He attempted to overhaul and modernize China's industry and economy in the Great Leap Forward; however national turmoil, instability and economic failures resulted in widespread famine. Mao attempted rapid social change and the complete rejection of traditional ideas and values in the Cultural Revolution from 1966 to 1976. Mao rejected traditional and western influences, creating social chaos and uncertainty, which eventually led to the end of the political movement. However the Cultural Revolution created a deep generational divide and national instability, which bolstered efforts to strengthen the national government and modernize the country. State control and modernization are reflected in modern Chinese pregnancy and childbirth, through the use of biomedical technology to control human health and reproduction.

=== Family planning policies ===
During the Great Leap Forward mortality rates declined rapidly while birth rates slowed, then between 1958 and 1961 birth rates plummeted while mortality rose due to famine. In the years following the famine, the birth rate quickly rose again then began a steady decline as the result of government policy regulating births. The relatively high birth rates, coupled with decreasing overall mortality and infant mortality created a population boom in the mid 20th century. Government control of birthing began with recommendations to limit children during the 1950s, and re-emerged with the “later-longer-fewer” policy that encouraged women to delay their first pregnancies, increase birth intervals, and have fewer children overall in the early 1970s. These policies were formalized in 1979 with the implementation of China's Planned Birth Policy, often called the one-child policy.

The policy was most restrictive in the early 1980s, when enforcement was dictated at the local and regional level. Extreme measures included forced sterilization and birth control methods, female infanticide and selective abortion; however legislation outlawed these by the 1990s. Typical enforcement measures included heavy fines for additional children, state-sponsored propaganda, the revocation of benefits, and job loss. Families were encouraged to have one child through monthly stipends for single-child households, longer paid maternity leave, priority when applying for public services such as schooling, housing and healthcare, and supplemental pensions. In addition, family planning resources, including birth control and abortions were, and continue to be, widely available and culturally accepted. Despite the initial enforcement, the policy gradually relaxed throughout its existence, especially in rural areas, to offer exceptions, such as for ethnic minorities, families who have lost a child, parents whose first child has a physical or intellectual disability, and families in which both parents are only children.

In 2015, the one-child policy was officially replaced with an unconditional two-child policy in order to address the strain on the workforce to support an aging population. However, due to longstanding government pressure to reduce fertility and the economic barriers to child-rearing, including the lack of sufficient childcare, many Chinese women express a desire to only have one child, despite the changes in policy.

The lasting effects of China's family planning policies remain hotly debated. The extreme population growth was largely halted, although some attribute this to social and economic changes rather than government policies. Women benefit from one-child households, through increased independence and freedom for mothers, a reduction in maternal mortality and easy access to birth control and safe abortions. Only children benefit from increased parental involvement and resources. However, the policy is widely criticized for limiting reproductive freedom, creating a gender imbalance with approximately 1.2 times as many males as females, and the increasing the economic strain caused by an aging population with decreasing support from working adults.

== Pregnancy ==
=== Prenatal medical care ===
In 2018, 99.6% of pregnant women received some sort of prenatal care. However, the quality and quantity of prenatal care varies significantly across socioeconomic and geographical lines. A study in 2011 found that in rural areas, women who receive prenatal care have an average of 5 visits, and approximately 63% of pregnant women from rural areas have a prenatal examination within the first 12 weeks. For urban and semi-urban women, prenatal care is similarly dictated by socioeconomic stratification. In state-run hospitals, prenatal care is provided first-come first-served, and women often travel long distances, have extensive wait times, and lack continuity of care throughout pregnancy. Woman-baby hospitals offer slightly more consistent and personalized care due to their smaller size.

=== Cultural practices ===
Despite the biomedicalization of birth and delivery, many Chinese women adhere to traditional restrictions and taboos during pregnancy. Food restrictions are typically related to maintaining a proper qi by avoiding over accumulation of yin by avoiding foods high in yin, such as cold foods, including watermelon and banana, and "wet-hot" foods, such as shrimp and pineapple. Other food taboos specific to pregnancy include mutton, which is thought to increase epilepsy risk, and dark foods, such as chocolate and coffee, which are thought to darken an infants complexion. Traditional behavior restrictions on pregnant women include avoiding renovations, moving heavy objects, participating in celebrations, preparing an infant's bed, attending funerals, raising hands above the head cutting the wings and legs off a chicken or using scissors near a bed. The justifications for these restrictions range from the physical health and safety of a pregnant woman to traditional folk beliefs, such as the idea that the use of scissors on or near a bed increases the risk of clef palate. While studies have found links between strong adherence to cultural taboos and poor physical health, the causality of the relationship is inconclusive. Studies of perceived stress during the prenatal period have found that adherence to cultural norms can strengthen familial harmony, reducing maternal stress, which is associated with improved outcomes.

== Labor and birth ==
=== Location ===
Approximately 80% of Chinese births occur in hospitals or clinics. These include private hospitals, state-run hospitals, women-baby hospitals, and rural health clinics. Modern Western-style private hospitals are the preferred birth location for wealthy urban-dwellers and foreigners. These facilities are characterized by luxury and an emphasis on scientific biomedical care. They are often staffed by a combination of Chinese and internationally trained staff. Private hospitals are inaccessible to most Chinese women due to their relative scarcity and extremely high fees. State-run multi-use hospitals offer a more affordable birthing process, while still following modern Western birthing practices. Many women travel great distances for the perceived safety of these facilities, which are often characterized by extensive waiting periods, a lack of continuity in prenatal care and delivery, and impersonal delivery experiences. Women-baby hospitals are another birthing option in larger cities and towns throughout China. These smaller facilities are staffed by zhuchanshi, modern birth attendants who perform vaginal deliveries, abortions and C-sections. These facilities are increasingly popular with women seeking affordable biomedical birth experiences, and similar to the state-run hospitals, women often travel from rural areas to give birth. With the exception of ultra-modern private hospitals, hospital labor often occurs in communal rooms, where laboring women are separated by stages. In some cases, family are allowed in early labor or postpartum recovery rooms, but the delivery room is reserved for medical staff and birthing women.

For women in rural areas, especially in minority regions, childbirth and maternal care are less influenced by Western biomedical practices. Births typically occur in local multi-use rural health centers, which range greatly in sanitation, equipment and staffing, based on the economic status of the surrounding areas. While home births are increasingly rare and government pressure seeks to eliminate the practice, they continue to occur, especially for women who are impoverished, from extremely rural areas, members of ethnic minorities or evading family planning policies. A study in 2010 found that the most common reported reasons for the continued practice of home births in the rural Shanxi Province are economic struggles, low quality prenatal care, lack of transportation, fear of hospitals and the convenience of home birth.

=== Birth attendants ===
The modernization and professionalization of midwifery first emerged as the early republican government sought to improve public health problems, but early national crises prevented large scale change in birthing practices for many years. By the 1930s, Western influence resulted in the establishment of midwifery schools, and the new formally trained midwives were called zhuchanshi, to differentiate them from folk-trained jieshengpo. In early communist China under Mao, birthing practices were standardized while trained midwives took on a greater role in labor and delivery. In the post-Mao era, the divide between midwives and doctors began to grow again.

The decentralization of healthcare has eliminated standard training for modern jieshengpo, with some training in specialized midwifery programs and others training as nurses and gaining midwifery experience throughout their career. For hospital births physicians are now regarded as the desired medical providers for childbirth. The trend towards profitable interventions has further amplified the role of physicians in childbirth settings with zhuchanshi often acting an assistants to obstetricians or facilitating uncomplicated vaginal deliveries. However, midwives practice with greater autonomy and scope in rural clinics and smaller woman-baby hospitals, where physicians are limited. In rural areas with increased rates of home births, jieshengpo continue to offer comprehensive care during labor and delivery.

=== Interventions ===
From 1991 to 2018, the maternal mortality ratio in China decreased dramatically from 80 to 18.3 deaths per 100,000 live births. Due to political calls to modernize and adopt Western biomedical technology, medical interventions are common in labor and delivery when performed in private, women-baby or state-run hospitals.

Private hospitals often have ample resources to provide laboring women with private rooms, effective pain relief, and obstetrician facilitated birthing experiences. In state-run hospitals, vaginal births in communal delivery rooms are associated with extremely high rates of labor-inducing drugs and episiotomies. Some women-baby hospitals employ pain reduction methods, including epidurals and TENS, but they remain rare. Cesarean sections are often encouraged by physicians to increase the speed of delivery and profits. Urban state-run hospitals can have cesarean rates of up to 70-90%. At woman-baby hospitals, cesarean sections are slightly less common with rates of 40-90%. In addition to government pressure for modernization of childbirth and hospital desires to maximize the efficiency and profitability of childbirth, high cesarean rates are also driven by a maternal desire to eliminate the pain and uncertainty of vaginal delivery. Cesarean deliveries have become a socioeconomic status symbol for women who can afford to avoid the pain associated with childbirth. Despite efforts to minimize unnecessary cesarean deliveries on local and national levels, the cesarean delivery rate increased from 28.8% in 2008 to 36.7% in 2018. While cesarean deliveries decreased in supercities, the cesarean rate is increasing in both general cities and rural populations.

== Postpartum ==
=== Doing the month ===
Despite modernization and the elimination of traditional Chinese medicine in many aspects of childbearing, many postnatal Chinese women continue to practice zuoyuezi, or "doing the month". Doing the month is a traditional postnatal custom dating to the Song dynasty, which has been passed down through generations. Doing the month is based on the traditional Chinese medicine philosophy of Yin and Yang. The postnatal period is traditionally viewed as a time of chaos within a woman's body, where she has a surplus of Yin energy, which must be restored by avoiding sources of Yin and seeking out sources of Yang. In practice, zuoyuezi is a month long period of seclusion and recovery, involving the presence of one's mother-in-law or another female caregiver to assist with recuperation, avoiding cold Yin-heavy foods and environments, an emphasis on warm water and eating a balance of hot and cold foods. Zuoyuezi is often viewed as a necessary and compulsory practice following childbirth, but maternal experiences vary greatly. Some women report appreciating the opportunity for rest and recovery, increased confidence in their childcare abilities and a sense of intergenerational connection, while others report dissatisfaction with the obligation to follow taboos, conflict with mother-in-laws or experiencing a lack of family support while "doing the month". In response to changes in familial structures and the medicalization of childbirth, increasing numbers of women rely on home health workers, called yuezi nurses, to support them during zuoyuezi, and zuoyuezi centers are increasingly common, both in China and internationally in areas with large numbers of Chinese immigrants.

=== Postpartum depression ===
Postpartum depression occurs in an estimated 30% of Chinese women 1–3 years postpartum. A 2008 study found that postpartum depression (PPD) is twice as common in women who practiced zuoyuezi despite considering the practice unhelpful and in women who are cared for by their mother-in-law. Other risk factors included a lack of partner support, difficult pregnancy, poor infant health, a history of depression and anxious attachment styles. Protective factors against PPD include childbirth classes and socioeconomic status. Despite the prevalence of PPD, very few women seek professional emotional support in the postpartum period.
