= Pamela Palenciano =

Spanish communicator and feminist activist

- Pamela Palenciano Jódar
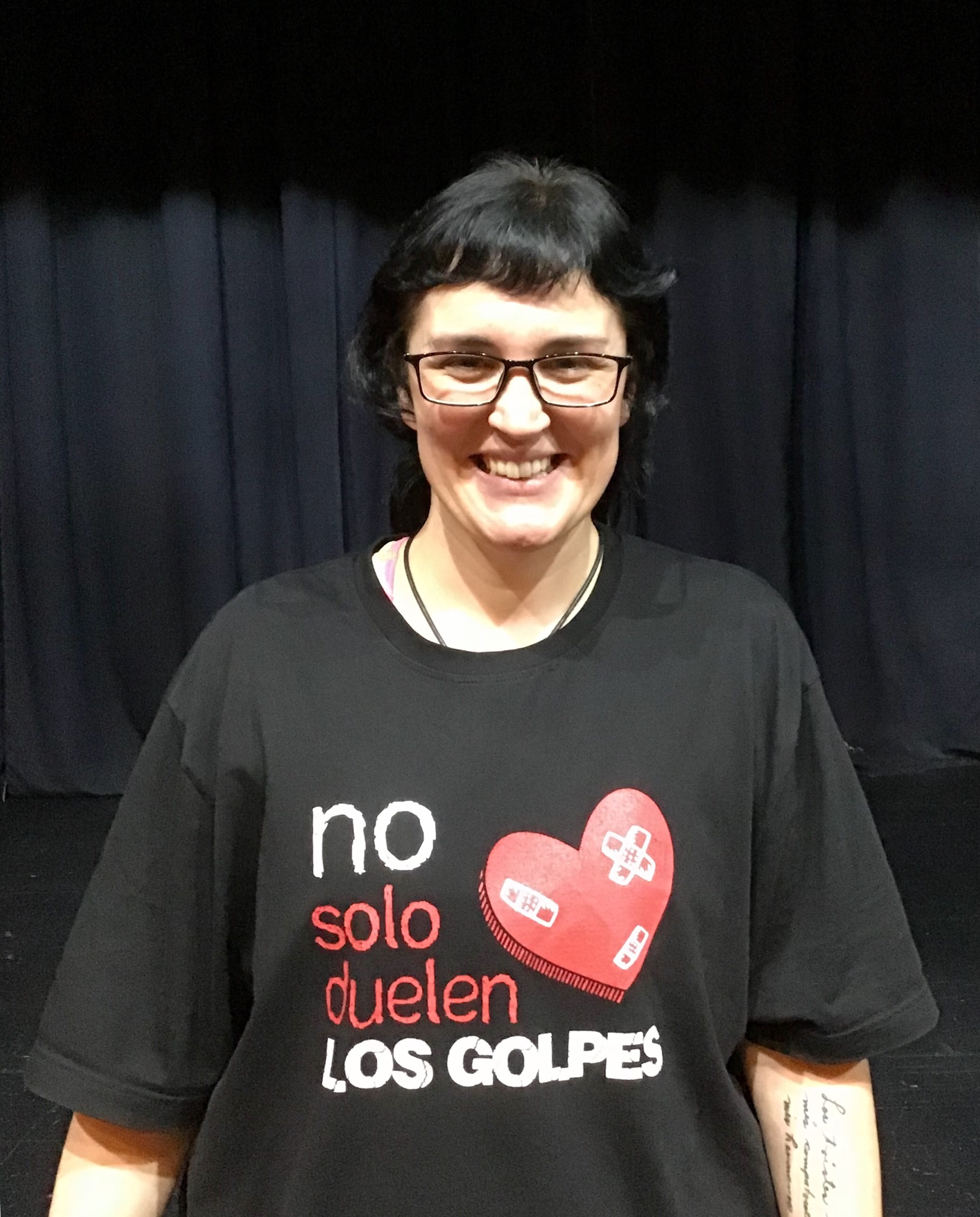
- Born: 1982 (age 43–44); Andújar, Spain
- Education: Audiovisual Communication
- Alma mater: University of Málaga
- Occupation: Communicator

Pamela Palenciano (Andújar, Spain, 1982) is a Spanish monologist, communicator and feminist activist, recognized for her theatrical monologue No solo duelen los golpes (Not only the blows hurt), an autobiographical story about gender violence through humor and irony.

== Biography ==
From the age of 12 to 18 she had a romantic relationship with a boy. During this time her boyfriend mistreated and exercised violence on her in very different ways, even attempting murder.

She managed to end her relationship when she moved to begin her studies in Audiovisual Communication at the University of Málaga. It was during this period that she realized that she had been abused. Then she began a psychological therapy and contact with feminist movements, understanding that her case was not exclusively personal, but was part of a global problem because of living in a patriarchal and sexist society.

After graduating, she spent 8 years living in El Salvador and then returning to Spain.

== "No solo duelen los golpes" ==
Her play is inspired by one of the phrases that her psychologist told her in therapy: not only the blows hurt (no solo duelen los golpes). It began first as a photographic exhibition in which she described what she had felt and lived, and later, it was transformed into a violence prevention workshop linked to those photos.

While living in El Salvador, she discovered theatre and reformulated the project to turn it into a monologue aimed both at secondary schools as well as the general public.

In the play she approaches from her own experience the myth of romantic love, jealousy, control and possession, psychological, sexual and physical violence, or the own aggressiveness as a result of living with an abuser, as well as the recovery and the establishment of another model of love.

She has staged No solo duelen los golpes in several countries in Latin America and in many Spanish cities. She has also received several awards for her contributions to the prevention of gender-based violence in schools.

== Controversy ==
On 14 March 2019, she mocked and insulted a group of Spanish high school students by calling them "gilipollas" (Spanish insult that translates as "bastards").

== Activism ==
In March 2022 she was amongst 151 international feminists signing Feminist Resistance Against War: A Manifesto, in solidarity with the Russian Feminist Anti-War Resistance. (Note: This manifesto was criticized by both Ukrainian feminists and members of the Feminist Anti-War Resistance themselves.)

== Books ==
- Si es amor, no duele (If it's love, it doesn't hurt), 2017.
