= Feminism of the 99% =

Grassroots radical feminist movement

Feminism of the 99% is a contemporary, grassroots, radical feminist movement, which recognises intersectionality and advocates activism for and by all women, including those who have been overlooked by other feminist movements. It was proposed by a collective of prominent American feminists in an appeal published in Viewpoint Magazine in February 2017, and built upon the mobilisation of women seen in the 2017 Women's March in January. The appeal simultaneously called for an International Women's Strike on 8 March 2017. It is a successor to the accumulated intellectual legacy of feminist movements such as radical feminism, Marxist feminism, Black feminism and transnational/decolonial feminism, and asserts that gender oppression is not caused by a single factor, sexism. They insist that it is rather a multifaceted product of the intersections of sexism, racism, colonialism and capitalism.

== Background ==
The demand for a feminism of the 99% was published in Viewpoint Magazine on 3 February 2017. It was made in response to the mass mobilisation of women seen in the 2017 Women's March – a worldwide protest on 21 January 2017 – protesting the inauguration of Donald Trump as President of the United States and advocating for women's rights, human rights and policy reform. The authors cite the Argentinian movement Ni Una Menos as their inspiration, as it too is a fourth-wave grassroots movement which aims to address intersectional issues. Aiming to build on the momentum of the Women's March, the authors call attention to what they see as the failures of contemporary feminist movements such as lean-in feminism, which they argue have failed the "overwhelming majority" of women who "do not have access to individual self-promotion and advancement and whose conditions of life can be improved only through policies that defend social reproduction, secure reproductive justice, and guarantee labor rights". They further argue that the conditions of life of women have deteriorated over the last 30 years due to corporate globalisation and capitalist systems, especially those of colour, of working class, of migrant backgrounds or who are unemployed.

== Key criticisms and demands ==
Feminism of the 99% criticises other contemporary feminist movements, such as lean-in feminism and corporate feminism, for only serving the privileged top 1% of women. It holds the logic that women are able to succeed in their career as long as they work to serve the benefit of the patriarchy, and that this relies on these women having access to resources and opportunities that most women are unable to access. The authors of the appeal recognise the need for a feminist movement which serves the needs of the many, and calls attention to the women who are overlooked by neoliberal feminism. However, they call for the movement to look beyond just issues of gender, criticising a number of key issues and movements including: racialized gender violence, the failings of neoliberalism, attacks on labour rights and the undervaluing of labour; reproductive injustices; homophobia; transphobia; and xenophobia. The aim of the movement is to contribute to what its creators see as "a new international feminist movement with an expanded agenda–at once anti-racist, anti-imperialist, anti-heterosexist, and anti-neoliberal".

== Authors of the manifesto ==
- Angela Davis
- Barbara Ransby
- Cinzia Arruzza
- Keeanga-Yamahtta Taylor
- Linda Martín Alcoff
- Nancy Fraser
- Rasmea Yousef Odeh
- Tithi Bhattacharya

== Related movements ==
Feminism of the 99% has ideological groundings consistent with different but distinct feminist groups. Best understood as a rejection of a perceived failure of mainstream liberal feminism, feminism of the 99% seeks to combine the positions of anti-racism, anti-sexism, and anti-neoliberalism. In doing so Feminism of the 99% is linked very closely to existing feminist movements globally.

=== Intersectional feminist thought ===
Intersectional feminist thought holds that the lived experience of oppression cannot simply be observed through a single lens of identity: that it is the combinations of identity expressions, and the kind of experience afforded together that provide a more accurate picture of the hierarchies under which one operates. Intersectionality considers that various forms of social stratification, such as class, race, sexual orientation, age, disability and gender, do not exist separately from each other but are interwoven together. Feminism for the 99% embraces this framework on a fundamental level, and purports that meaningful change must originate from those who experience it firsthand.

=== Black feminism ===
Black feminism is a school of thought stating that sexism, class oppression, gender identity and racism are inextricably bound together. Naturally, this closely aligns with feminism for the 99% given their simultaneous use of intersectionality. A point of difference between the two movement is that feminism for the 99% has a defined strategy for change, taking inspiration from Ni Una Menos.

=== Socialist feminism ===
Socialist feminism is feminism that focuses upon the interconnectivity of the patriarchy and capitalism. Feminism of the 99% frequently parallels with socialist feminism given their similar critical assessments of capitalism, and the role of domestic work and social reproduction theory.

Angela Davis, as one of the keystone ideological sources of feminism for the 99%'s ideological perspective holds liberal feminism in contempt for its failure to address the concerns of women perceived to be betrayed by their class position: "If standards for feminism are created for those who have already ascended the economic hierarchies of feminism, how is this relevant to women at the bottom?". In other words, Davis criticises liberal feminists for acting primarily in the interests of women whose privilege insulates them from race-based and class-based disadvantage.

Tithi Bhattacharya, another key signatory of the feminism for the 99% manifesto, has expanded on social reproduction theory within the context of gender, providing a marxist analysis of gender disparate divisions of labor as an integral part of the capitalist mode of production. Specifically, Bhattacharya suggests that the unpaid acts of childbirth, child-rearing, and domestic duties are themselves acts of productive labor, acted within an as exploitative context consistent with marxist labor theory. A key point, is that these acts are disparately the role of women.

In stark contrast to liberal feminism, feminism for the 99% holds that effective and meaningful change comes from a non-reformist perspective: i.e., that revolutionary change necessitates a more utopian vision. Feminism for the 99% holds that incremental adjustment of an existing unjust and oppressive hierarchy will never precipitate a just society. To this end, a change from the ground up is required.

=== Ni Una Menos ===
The Feminism of the 99% manifesto specifically cites Ni Una Menos as a source of inspiration for the movement. Specifically, the use of a mass strike of all women as the main form of political activism. On 8 March 2017 (International Women's Day), activists across the feminist continuum organised the International Women's Strike (known in the US as the Day Without Women), and the 2017 Women's March. The 2017 Women's Day March was the largest single day protest in US history.
