= Feminist Anti-War Resistance =

Feminist Anti-War Resistance Феминистское антивоенное сопротивление
- Abbreviation: FAR (English); FAS (Russian)
- Leader: Collective leadership
- Psychological services director: Sasha Starost
- Founder: Daria Serenko and unnamed activists
- Founded: February 2022
- Ideology: Feminism; Anti-war movement Liberal democracy
- Political position: Big tent
- Colours: Yellow; Blue

Website
- Telegram page

Feminist Anti-War Resistance (FAR or FAWR, Russian: Феминистское антивоенное сопротивление (ФАС), romanized: Feministskoye antivoyennoye soprotivleniye (FAS)) is a group of Russian feminists founded in February 2022 to protest against the 2022 Russian invasion of Ukraine. In its first month, FAR became "one of Russia’s fastest-growing anti-war campaigns", attracting more than 26,000 followers on Telegram.

On 23 December 2022, Russia's Ministry of Justice added the movement to the so-called list of foreign agents. In April 2024, the movement was labeled as an "undesirable organization".

== Manifesto ==
In a manifesto released on the group's Telegram channel, the group called on feminists around the world to come together to oppose the war launched by Vladimir Putin's government:

Today feminists are one of the few active political forces in Russia. For a long time, Russian authorities did not perceive us as a dangerous political movement, and therefore we were temporarily less affected by state repression than other political groups. Currently more than forty-five different feminist organizations are operating throughout the country, from Kaliningrad to Vladivostok, from Rostov-on-Don to Ulan-Ude and Murmansk. We call on Russian feminist groups and individual feminists to join the Feminist Anti-War Resistance and unite forces to actively oppose the war.

An English translation of the manifesto was published in Jacobin, and the manifesto has been translated into almost 30 languages, including Tatar, Chuvash, and Udmurt.

== Activities ==
On 8 March 2022, International Women's Day, Feminist Anti-War Resistance organized the laying of flowers – chrysanthemums and tulips bound with blue and yellow ribbons – by women at Great Patriotic War monuments:

We, the women of Russia, refuse to celebrate March 8 this year: don't give us flowers, it's better to take to the streets and lay them in memory of the dead civilians of Ukraine.

The protests extended to embassies as well as monuments, and took place across 94 Russian and international cities.

Activists have continued to innovate protest tactics: writing anti-war slogans on banknotes, installing art objects in parks, wearing all black in public as a sign of mourning, handing out flowers, or simply crying in the Moscow metro. As the activist Daria Serenko commented, tactics needed to continue to adapt to evade Russia's criminalization of protest:

the situation changes every day. What was acceptable yesterday does not work today. A week ago, you could go out wearing black and hold a white rose in your hand. Now you will be detained for that. This is what happened to our activist Anna Loginova from Yekaterinburg. She received nine days of administrative arrest.

== Group Structure ==
FAR is a horizontal organization with no single leader or fixed hierarchies. The group is divided into separate cells with each cell organizing and directing its own activities. Cells exist both within Russia and internationally. International cells are able to promote the goals of FAR more vocally than members within Russia, who remain anonymous. Members are also divided into different positions. Coordinators oversee the work, activists carry out protest activities within a given city, and volunteers contribute time and professional skills without directly engaging in protests. All decisions are made through voting.

The group has also added a series of anti-war awareness growth groups (GRAS), which are designed to be safer for novice activists. These groups connect those sympathetic to the anti-war movement but new to activism and provide education on how to protest safely.

Activists are also instructed in cybersecurity, police avoidance, and other techniques to protect their personal safety. FAR member and poet Daria Serenko stated in 2022 that FAR also connects members with psychotherapists and lawyers if such support is needed. FAR communicates with the messaging software Telegram and with chat bots on Telegram, which allow anonymous communication between members.

== International responses ==
On 17 March 2022 151 feminists signed Feminist Resistance Against War: A Manifesto, framing themselves in solidarity with the FAR manifesto and Russian feminist anti-war activity. Signatories included Ailbhe Smyth, Alba Flores, Amaia Pérez Orozco, June Fernández, Keeanga-Yamahtta Taylor, Nancy Fraser, Özlem Demirel, Teresa Rodríguez, Tithi Bhattacharya, Yayo Herrero, Carmen Magallón, Pamela Palenciano, Goretti Horgan, Lidia Cirillo, Zillah R. Eisenstein, Judy Rebick, Ofelia García, El Jones, Shahrzad Mojab, Maristella Svampa, Debora Diniz, Heloísa Helena, Luciana Genro, Sonia Guajajara, Piedad Córdoba Ruiz, Miriam Miranda, Mónica Baltodano, Daria Serenko, Diane Lamoureux, Pamela Philipose, Silvia Federici and Talíria Petrone. The manifesto calls for "a bold redirection of the situation to break the militaristic spiral initiated by Russia and supported by NATO." By the end of March the manifesto had collected over 2,500 signatures.

A member of the Feminist Anti-War Resistance later said that the similarly-named manifesto had led to some confusion about their own position, stating, "They advocate for the disarmament of Ukraine. We don’t agree with that and are for arming Ukraine, but [the group’s name] made people think they were writing on behalf of FAR." On July 7, Commons, a left-wing Ukrainian magazine, released a counter-manifesto titled "The Right to Resist," saying the Feminist Resistance Against War's manifesto had denied Ukrainian women the right to resistance, "which constitutes a basic act of self-defense of the oppressed. We insist on the essential difference between violence as a means of oppression and as a legitimate means of self-defense." The many signatories of the Commons counter-manifesto include the Feminist Anti-War Resistance along with eight named members of the group.

== Challenges ==
FAR, along with other Russian opposition groups, has faced increased challenges in the years following the full-scale invasion of Ukraine. State repression of opposition has increased, making protesting more difficult. The activism done by FAR and other groups has had to take novel forms in order to evade state intervention. The increased pressure has led to infighting among members of various opposition groups, which further lowers morale.

Furthermore, many opposition members have left Russia in recent years, which limits the impact they can have inside Russia. In 2023 there were only an estimated 200 FAR activists remaining in Russia, down from 2,000 at the beginning of the war. Political exiles continue advocating against the war but no longer have on-the-ground perspective of Russian society and are often criticized by those who remain in the country. Keeping activism relevant to the reality of daily life in Russia while also making it palatable to Western organizations is a challenge for many exiled opposition members. Once residing in a new place, opposition figures often become subject to the standards of the host country and face the choice to either modify their activism to fit those standards or lose their funding. Ivan Preobrazhensky recalls being told explicitly beforehand to not use the word "struggle" before going to an event with European politicians because "[w]e can't create the impression that we support direct action in Russia."
