= Tithi Bhattacharya =

American activist and writer

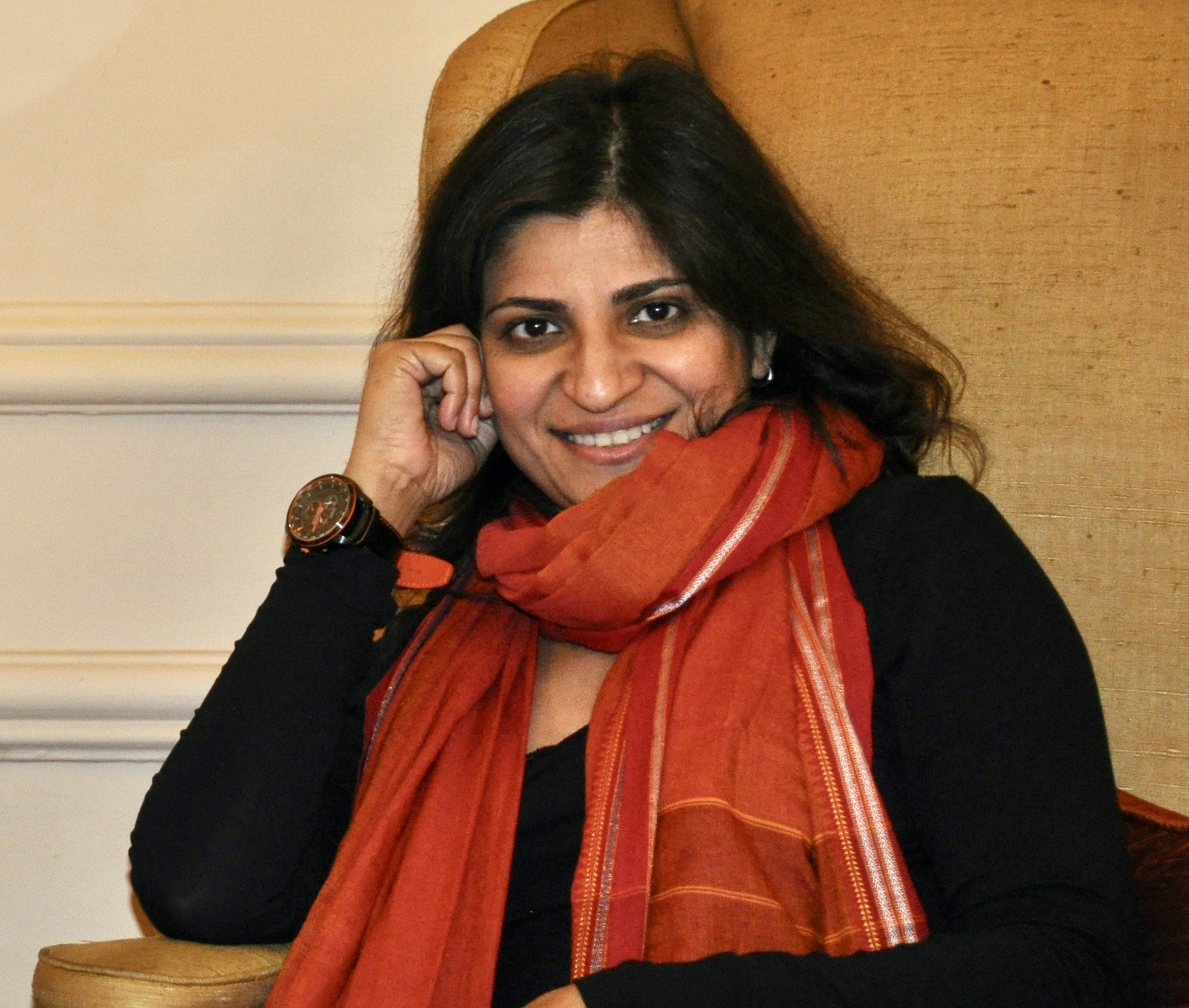
Tithi Bhattacharya

Tithi Bhattacharya is an American activist and writer. She is a professor of South Asian history at Purdue University.

== Biography ==
Bhattacharya was born in India. She applied for U.S. citizenship in 2015 after living there for nearly a decade. She cited the stress of applying for visas and the election of Narendra Modi as prime minister as reasons for applying for citizenship.

== Career ==
Bhattacharya is a Marxist feminist and one of the national organizers of the International Women's Strike on March 8, 2017. Bhattacharya is a vocal advocate of Palestinian rights and Boycott, Divestment and Sanctions (BDS).

Bhattacharya is one of the authors of Feminism for the 99%: A Manifesto, which ties feminism to other modes of struggle, including anti-racism and anti-capitalism. On the topic of gender Bhattacharya has written the book The Sentinels of Culture, which developed from her dissertation on the British-educated middle class in 19th-century Kolkata. She has also written on the politics of Islamophobia and women in Islam.

In March 2022, Bhattacharya was one of 151 international feminists to sign Feminist Resistance Against War: A Manifesto, in solidarity with the Russian Feminist Anti-War Resistance. This manifesto was criticized by both Ukrainian feminists and members of the Feminist Anti-War Resistance themselves.

In 2025, she published Ghostly Past, Capitalist Presence: A Social History of Fear in Colonial Bengal.

== Research ==
Bhattacharya was an editor of the book Social Reproduction Theory: Remapping Class, Recentering Oppression, a book that advanced social reproduction theory, a Marxist feminist theory that analyzes the role of women's labor under capitalism. She was described as a researcher "operating on the cutting edge of recent work on social reproduction theory".
