= Carmen Magallón =

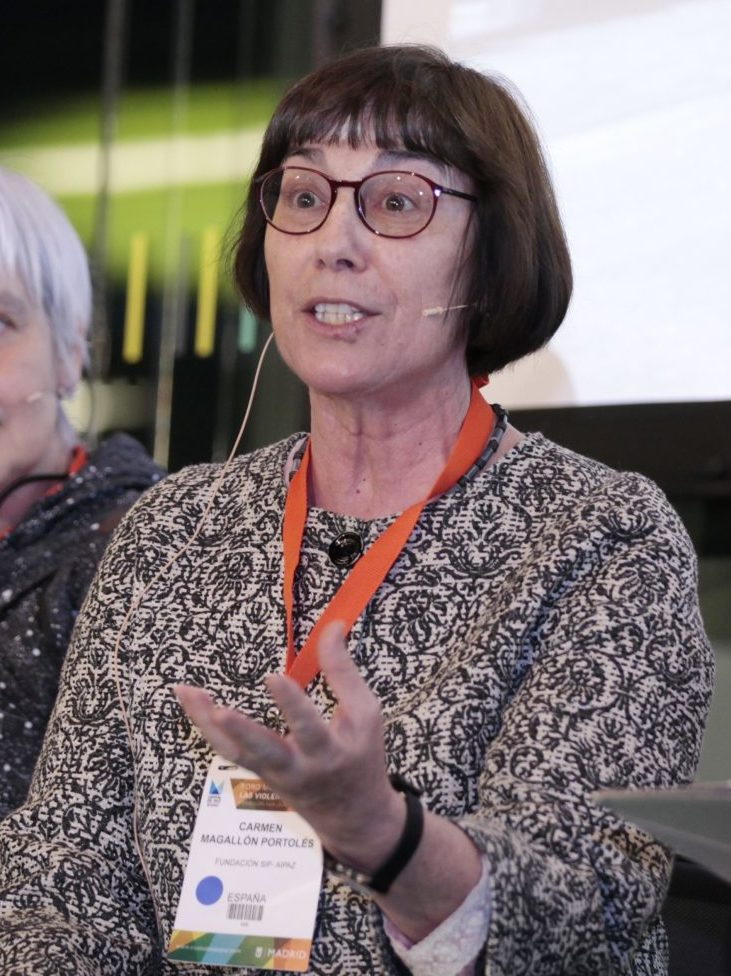
Carmen Magallón (2017).

Carmen Magallón-Portolés is a PhD, a physicist, and Master in Philosophy of Science by University of Zaragoza, Spain, committed with the advancement of women through researching their contributions to two important fields: science and peace. Her thinking is an important reference in the Spanish studies of Women in Science and Feminist Pacifism. Among her works in this field: Mujeres en pie de paz, Madrid, Siglo XXI, 2006 and Contar en el mundo. Una mirada sobre las relaciones internacionales desde las vidas de las mujeres, Madrid, Horas y horas, 2012.

In 2011 she was elected President of WILPF Spain, the Spanish section of the Women's International League for Peace and Freedom. In September 2013, the Martin Luther King Institute of the Polytechnic University of Nicaragua (UPOLI), in the celebration of its 20th anniversary awarded her the 'Order of Peace Martin Luther King': "for her outstanding contribution to the development of women's rights, the feminist thought and the construction of a culture of peace in the world". At the ceremony, Dr. Magallón presented the keynote: "Universalize female legacies, build a civilizatory rationality: steps towards a culture of peace". The Instituto Martin Luther King (IMLK) is part of the UPOLI, a Nicaraguan university located in Managua. Its main objective is to build a culture of peace.

In March 2022 she was amongst 151 international feminists signing Feminist Resistance Against War: A Manifesto, in solidarity with the Russian Feminist Anti-War Resistance. (Note: This manifesto was criticized by both Ukrainian feminists and members of the Feminist Anti-War Resistance themselves.)

Magallón's writings contribute to the recovery of the history of women, their experiences and their knowledge, as a prerequisite for building gender equality. While much of the literature on women in science comes from the English-speaking world, Magallón has focused particular attention on Spanish women scientists. Most of her works are included in the Dialnet database Dialnet at University of La Rioja, Spain.

== See also ==
- List of peace activists
