= Pamela Philipose =

Indian journalist and academic

Pamela Philipose is an Indian journalist and researcher, who is a senior fellow at the Indian Council of Social Science Research. She was the recipient of the Chameli Devi Jain Award for Outstanding Women Mediapersons in 1999 and has served as an advisor to the Media Task Force of the high level committee of the Government of India. In the 2020 edition of the Ramnath Goenka Excellence in Journalism Awards, she was appointed as one of the jurors along with the likes of B. N. Srikrishna and S. Y. Quraishi.

== Career ==
Philipose was the director and editor-in-chief of the Women's Feature Service and the senior associate editor of The Indian Express. She was also the author of the satirical column Straight Face and the author of a number of commentary pieces of The Indian Express. Since September 2016, Philipose is appointed as the public editor (ombudsman) of The Wire. She has worked as a journalist at The Times of India as well, the paper from where she began her career.

In March 2022 she was amongst 151 international feminists signing Feminist Resistance Against War: A Manifesto, in solidarity with the Russian Feminist Anti-War Resistance. (Note: This manifesto was criticized by both Ukrainian feminists and members of the Feminist Anti-War Resistance themselves.)

== Bibliography ==
=== Academic publications ===
- Across the Crossfire: Women and Conflict in India. (eds. 2002; with Bishnoi, Aditi) Kali for Women . ISBN 978-8-18-896520-5 .
- Women's Employment: Work in Progress. (eds. 2013; with Bishnoi, Aditi) Friedrich-Ebert-Stiftung ISBN 978-8-17-440070-3 .
- Media’s Shifting Terrain: Five Years that Transformed the Way India Communicates. (2018) Orient BlackSwan ISBN 978-9-35-287534-4 .

=== Contributions ===
- Ranjan, Nalini, ed. (2005) Practising Journalism: Values, Constraints, Implications. SAGE Publications. ISBN 978-0-7619-3378-6.
- Menon, Ritu, ed. (2011). Making a Difference: Memoirs from the Women's Movement in India. Kali for Women. ISBN 978-8-18-896567-0.
- Padgaonkar, Latika; Singh, Shubha, eds. (2012). Making News, Breaking News, Her Own Way. Tranquebar Press. ISBN 978-9-38-162649-8.

=== Others ===
- Laugh All the Way to the Vote Bank. (2002) Penguin Books ISBN 978-0-14-302824-6
