= Maristella Svampa =

Argentinian sociologist (born 1961)

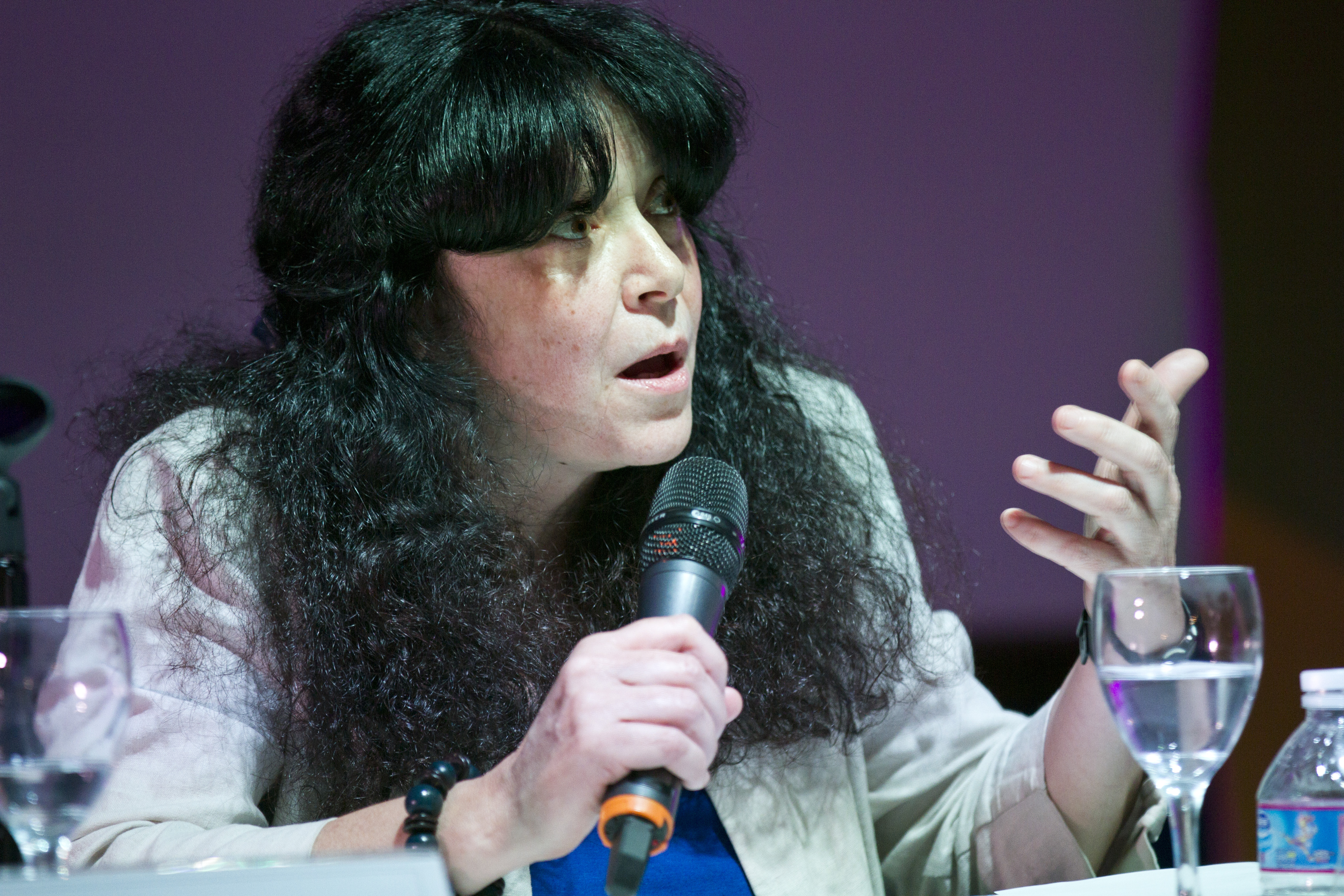
- Born: May 8, 1961 (age 64); Allen, Província de Río Negro, Argentina
- Occupation: Sociologist

Maristella Noemi Svampa (born May 8, 1961, in Allen, Província de Río Negro) is an Argentine sociologist.

== Biography ==
She got a B.A. in Philosophy at the Universidad Nacional de Córdoba, in 1984, and a PhD in Sociology at the École des Hautes Études en Sciences Sociales, in Paris. She is a full professor at the Universidad Nacional de La Plata and a researcher at the Consejo Nacional de Investigaciones Científicas y Técnicas, a public organization in Argentina that promotes science and technology. She is the head of the journal "Observatório Social de América Latina" (OSAL) of the Latin American Council of Social Sciences (CLACSO).

In March 2022 she was amongst 151 international feminists signing Feminist Resistance Against War: A Manifesto, in solidarity with the Russian Feminist Anti-War Resistance. (Note: This manifesto was criticized by both Ukrainian feminists and members of the Feminist Anti-War Resistance themselves.)

== Publications ==
- El dilema argentino: civilización o barbarie. De Sarmiento al revisionismo peronista (1994, reedited in 2006)
- La Plaza Vacía. Las transformaciones del peronismo (1997, with D.Martuccelli)
- Desde abajo. La transformación de las identidades sociales (2000, organizer)
- Los que ganaron. La vida en los countries y barrios privados (2001)
- Entre la ruta y el barrio. La experiencia de las organizaciones piqueteros (2003, with Sebastián Pereyra)
- La brecha urbana. Countries y barrios privados en Argentina (2004)
- La sociedad excluyente. La Argentina bajo el signo del neoliberalismo (2005)
- Bolivia. Memoria, insurgencia y movimientos sociales (2007, organized with Pablo Stefanoni)
- Gerard Althabe: Entre varios mundos. Reflexividad, conocimientos y compromiso (2008, organized with Valeria Hernandez)
- Cambio de época. Movimientos sociales y poder político (2008)
- Las vías de la emancipación. Conversaciones con Álvaro García Linera (2009, with Pablo Stefanoni e F. Ramírez)
- Minería transnacional, narrativas del desarrollo y resistencias sociales (2009, organized with Mirta A. Antonelli)
- Certezas, incertezas y desmesuras de un pensamiento político. Conversaciones con Floreal Ferrara (2010)
- Debatir Bolivia. Los contornos de un proyecto de descolonización (2010, with Pablo Stefanoni e Bruno Fornillo)
- Balance y Perspectivas. Intelectuales en el primer gobierno de Evo Morales (2010, with Pablo Stefanoni e Bruno Fornillo)
