= Social Education =

- Discipline: Education
- Language: English
- Edited by: Lewis Paul Todd

Publication details
- Former name: Historical Outlook
- History: 1930–present
- Publisher: National Council for the Social Studies (United States)
- Frequency: Bimonthly

Standard abbreviations
- ISO 4: Soc. Educ.

Indexing
- ISSN: 0037-7724 (print); 1930-3653 (web)
- LCCN: 40012480
- OCLC no.: 1042548389

Links
- Journal homepage

Social Education is a peer-reviewed academic journal covering social studies education in the United States. It is published by the National Council for the Social Studies.

== History ==
The National Council for the Social Studies's first president, Albert Edward McKinley (1870-1936), also served as the journal's publisher and managing editor. The publication was established in 1930 as Historical Outlook. In 1937 it became the official journal of the council, obtaining its current name.

== Abstracting and indexing ==
The journal is abstracted and indexed in EBSCO databases and the Modern Language Association Database.
