= Diane Lamoureux =

Canadian professor, writer and essayist (born 1954)

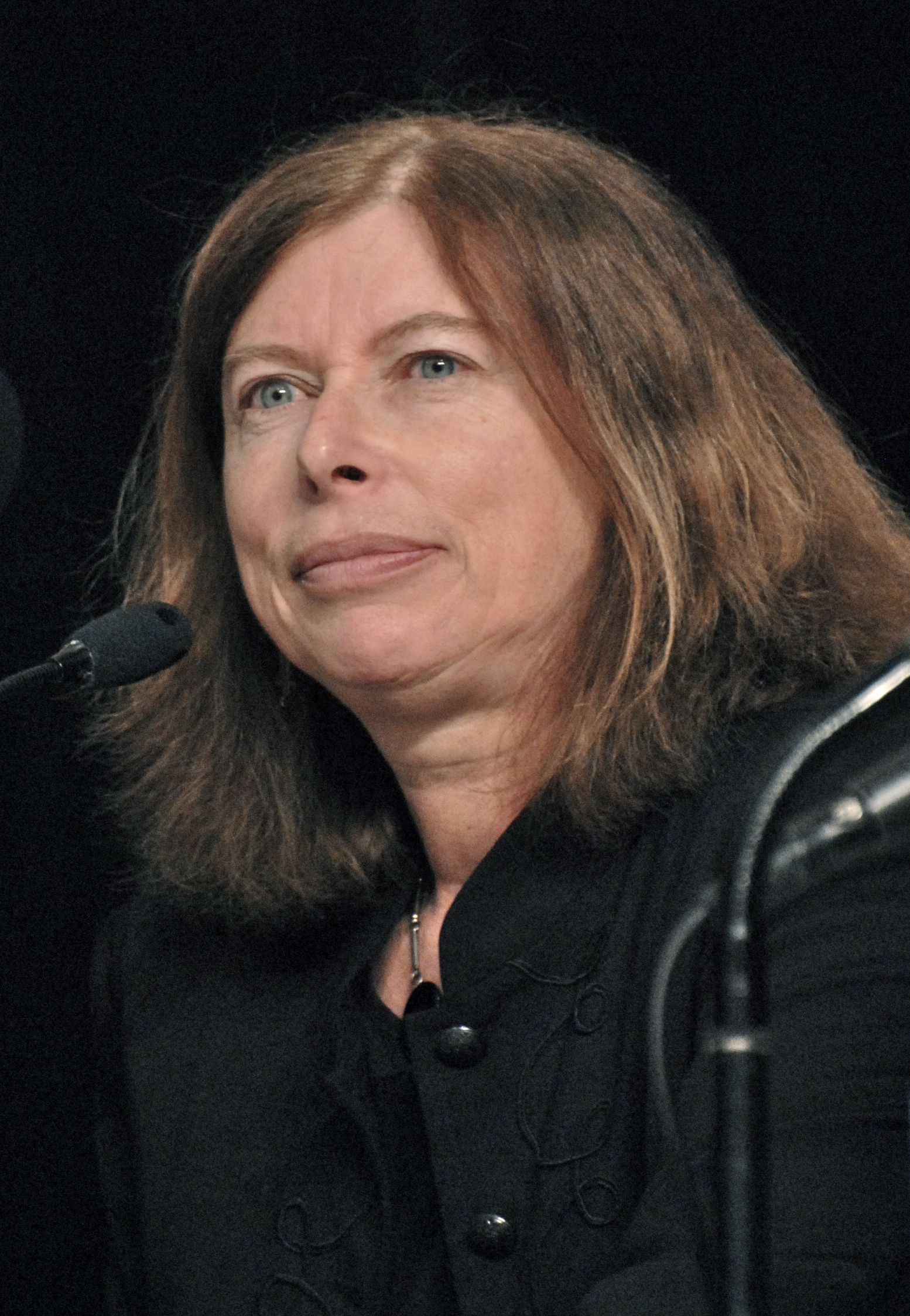
- Born: 20 October 1954 (age 71)

Academic work
- Institutions: Laval University
- Main interests: Sociology, feminism

Diane Lamoureux (born 20 October 1954) is a Canadian professor, essayist, and writer. She serves as Professor of Sociology in the Political Science Department of Laval University in Quebec. Her research focuses on the intersection of politics, sociology, and feminism. Lamoureux holds emeritus status at Laval University.

In March 2022 she was amongst 151 international feminists signing Feminist Resistance Against War: A Manifesto, in solidarity with the Russian Feminist Anti-War Resistance. (Note: This manifesto was criticized by both Ukrainian feminists and members of the Feminist Anti-War Resistance themselves.)

== Selected works ==
- Pensées rebelles: autour de Rosa Luxemburg, Hannah Arendt et Françoise Collin, Montréal, Les Éditions du Remue-Ménage, 2010.
- « Féminisme et mouvement des femmes : entre émancipation et libération », with Gaëtan Tremblay (dir.), L'émancipation hier et aujourd'hui, Québec, Presses de l'Université du Québec, 2009 : pp. 47–61.
- « Féminisme et démocratie libérale : un rapport paradoxal », with Martin Breaugh and Francis Dupuis-Déri (dir.), La démocratie au-delà du libéralisme : perspectives critiques, Montréal, Athéna, 2009 : pp. 139–157.
- Avec James Cohen, « La citoyenneté et les enjeux de la "diversité" », with James Cohen and Martine Spensky (dir.), Citoyenneté et diversité, Clermont-Ferrand, Presses universitaires Blaise-Pascal, 2009 : pp. 9-31.
- « Comment l'Égalité entre les femmes et les hommes est devenue une "valeur fondamentale de la société québécoise" », with Robert Laliberté (dir.), À la rencontre d'un Québec qui bouge, Paris, Éditions du Comité des travaux historiques t scientifiques, 2009 : pp. 77-90.
- « Et si le socialisme avait à apprendre du féminisme », with Hal Draper, Les deux âmes du socialisme, Paris, Syllepses, 2008 : pp. 171-179.
- « Reno(r/m)mer "la" lesbienne », Genres, sexualités, sociétés, number 1.
- « Masculinismo en Quebec : fenomeno global y local », La Manzana, III(6), octobre-décembre 2008.
- « Démocratiser radicalement la démocratie », Nouvelles pratiques sociales, 21(1), 2008 : pp. 121-138.
- « Les mouvements sociaux, vecteurs de l'inclusion politique », with Stephan Gervais, Dimitrios Karmis and Diane Lamoureux (dir.), Du tricoté serré au métissé serré ?, Québec, Presses de l'Université Laval, 2008 : pp. 207-226.
- « Un terreau antiféministe », with Mélissa Blais et Francis Dupuis-Déri (dir.), Le mouvement masculiniste au Québec. L'antiféminisme démasqué, Montréal, Remue-ménage, 2008.
- « Tabler sur les mouvements sociaux et la vigilance citoyenne », in collaboration with Lorraine Guay, with Pierre Mouterde (dir.), L'avenir est à gauche, Montréal, Éco-société, 2008.
- « Québec 2001 : Un tournant pour les mouvements sociaux québécois ? », with Francis Dupuis-Déri (dir.), Québec en mouvements, Montréal, Lux, 2008.
- « Les féminismes : histoires, acquis et nouveaux défis », Recherches féministes, 2007, 20 (2) : pp. 1-5.
- « Le mouvement pour l'égalité politique des femmes au Québec », with Marie-Blanche Tahon (dir.), Les femmes entre la ville et la cité, Montréal, Remue-ménage, 2007 : pp. 145-163.
- « Les féminismes », volume 2, number 5, 2007 in the review, Recherches féministes.
- « Les tentatives d'instrumentalisation de la société civile par l'État », with Francine Saillant and Éric Gagnon (dir.), Communautés et socialistes, Montréal, Liber, 2005.
- « Le féminisme et l'altermondialisation », Recherches féministes, 17 (2), 2004.
- « Traces lesbiennes dans le paysage urbain montréalais », with Christine Bard (dir.), Le genre des territoires, Presses de l'Université d'Angers, 2004.
- « Conclusion », with Francine Saillant et Manon Boulianne (dir.), Transformations sociales, genre et santé, Paris/Québec, Harmattan/Presses de l'Université Laval, 2003.
- « Le mythe de l'État-nation dans le nationalisme québécois depuis la révolution tranquille », with Raphaël Canet and Jules Duchastel (dir.), La nation en débat, Montréal, Éditions Athéna, 2003.
- « Canada et Québec », with Didier Éribon (dir.), Dictionnaire des cultures gays et lesbiennes, Paris, Larousse, 2003.
- « Les politiques identitaires : apports et limites », Contre-Temps, 7, mai 2003.
- « L'allocation universelle : un enjeu féministe ? », Actes de l'atelier La sécurité économique des femmes : les critiques féministes du discours économique dominant et les nouvelles avenues des politiques sociales, IREF, Montréal, 2003.
- « Le paradoxe du corps chez Simone de Beauvoir », with Christine Delphy and Sylvie Chaperon (dir.), Cinquantenaire du Deuxième sexe. Colloque international Simone de Beauvoir, Paris, Syllepses, 2002.
- Avec Évelyne Pedneault, « Un féminisme international ? », with Gilles Brunel and Claude-Yves Charron (dir.), La communication internationale. Mondialisation, acteurs et territoires socio-culturels, Montréal, Gaëtan Morin Éditeur, 2002.
- « Mutations et limites de l'identitaire au Québec », Revue d'études constitutionnelles, 7(1-2), 2002 : pp. 255-271.
- « Le dilemme entre politiques et pouvoir », Cahiers de recherche sociologique, 37, 2002.
- L'amère patrie. Féminisme et nationalisme dans le Québec contemporain, Montréal, Les Éditions du remue-ménage, 2001.
- « La démocratie avec les femmes », Globe, 3(2), 2001 : pp. 23-42.
- « La double postérité du Deuxième sexe », with Cécile Coderre and Marie-Blanche Tahon (dir.), Le deuxième sexe. Une relecture en trois temps 1949-1971-1999, Montréal, Les Éditions du remue-ménage, 2001.
- « Le souci de soi comme substitut au souci du monde », with Lucille Beaudry and Laurence Olivier (dir.), Le politique par le détour de l'art, de l'éthique et de la philosophie, Sillery, Les Presses de l'Université du Québec, 2001.
- Malaises identitaires. Échanges féministes autour d'un Québec incertain, (in collaboration with Chantal Maillé and Micheline de Sève), Montréal, Éditions du remue-ménage, 1999.
- « La posture du fils », with Diane Lamoureux, Chantal Maillé and Micheline De Sève (dir.), Malaises identitaires. Échanges féministes autour d'un Québec incertain, Montréal, Éditions du remue-ménage, 1999.
- Les limites de d'identité sexuelle, Montréal, Éditions du remue-ménage, 1998.
- « La question lesbienne dans le féminisme montréalais », with Frank Remiggi and Irène Demcuk (dir.), Sortir de l'ombre, VLB, Montréal, 1998.
- « Le cœur à Sparte, la tête à Athènes », with Laurence Olivier et al. (dir.), Épistémologie de la science politique, Sillery, PUQ, 1998.
- « Agir sans "nous" », with Diane Lamoureux (dir.), Les limites de l'identité sexuelle, Montréal, Éditions du remue-ménage, 1998.
