= US Food Sovereignty Alliance =

American food advocacy group

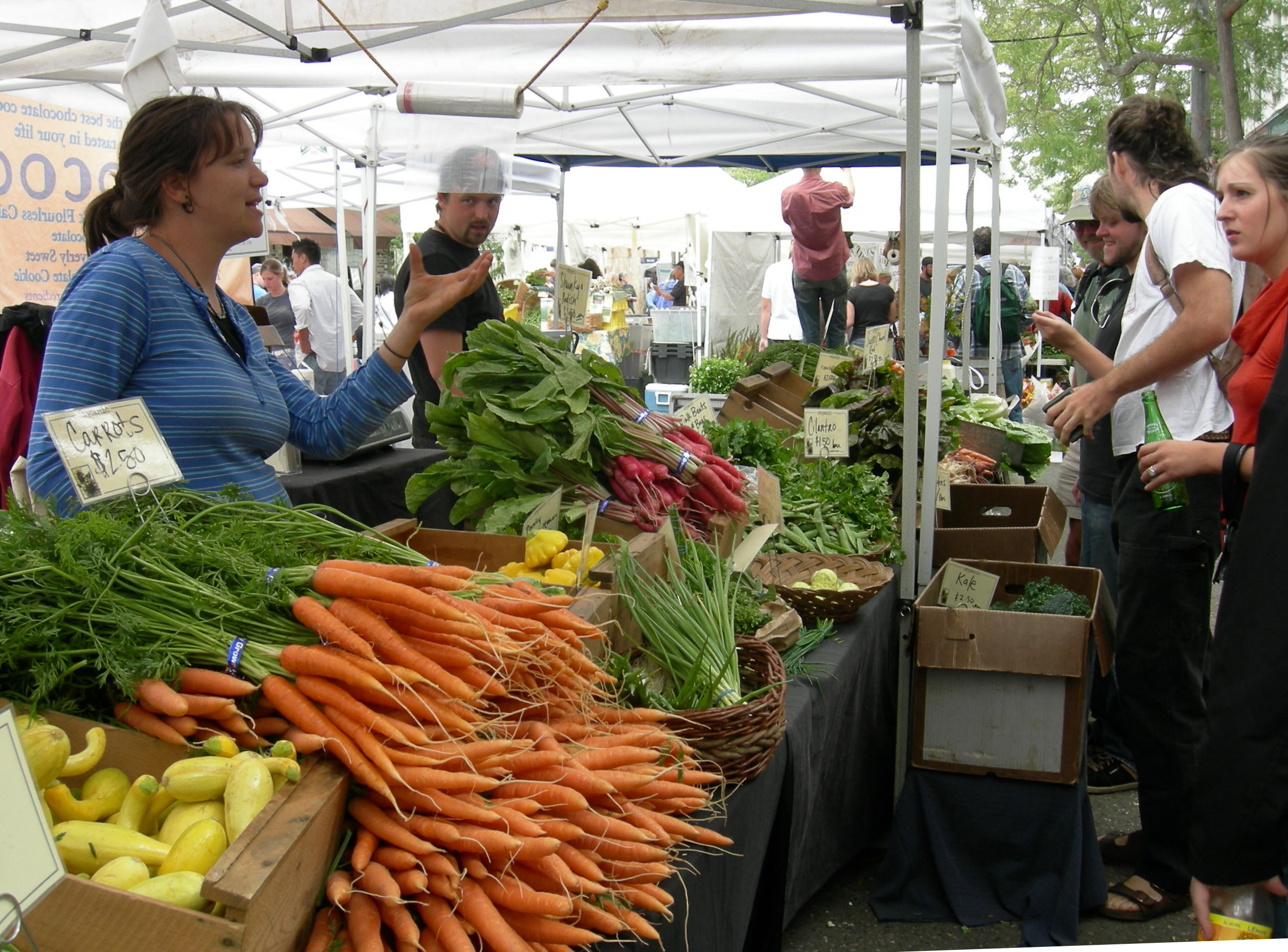
The USFSA supports local farming and access to healthy, sufficient food.

The United States Food Sovereignty Alliance is a group of food producers and labor, environmental, faith-based, social justice and anti-hunger advocacy organizations, including the Applied Research Center, Family Farm Defenders, the Indigenous Environmental Network, and the National Family Farm Coalition. The USFA advocates food sovereignty, which is the right to sufficient and culturally appropriate food to all people and communities, and aims to reestablish better relations between food producers and consumers, placing the needs of local farmers, fishers, indigenous peoples and landless workers most impacted by global hunger, poverty, and unbalanced food distribution above agribusiness and larger corporations. The USFA is organized into four Alliance Teams: Land & Resource Grabs, Immigrant Rights & Trade, Defense of Mother Earth, and Racism & Leadership.

The US Food Sovereignty Alliance is a member of the International Planning Committee for Food Sovereignty, and the Right to Food and Nutrition Watch Consortium, which includes “Brot für die Welt” (Bread for the world), FoodFirst Information and Action Network (FIAN), and Interchurch Organisation for Development Cooperation (ICCO), among others. The Alliance awards the Food Sovereignty Prize annually.

== Mission statement ==
The USFSA's mission, according to their founding document, is as follows:

"The US Food Sovereignty Alliance works to end poverty, rebuild local food economies, and assert democratic control over the food system. We believe all people have the right to healthy, culturally appropriate food, produced in an ecologically sound manner. As a US-based alliance of food justice, anti-hunger, labor, environmental, faith-based, and food producer groups, we uphold the right to food as a basic human right and work to connect our local and national struggles to the international movement for food sovereignty."

== History ==
The US Food Sovereignty Alliance was officially founded in 2009. The Alliance supports the concept of food sovereignty under the definition provided by La Vía Campesina (LVC), which originally proposed the idea at the 1996 World Food Summit. A group of activists and supporters came together to form the Working Group on the Food Crisis in 2008, a previous version of the Alliance, to address issues such as increasing food prices, global hunger, unequal food distribution and food insecurity. Part of this group were representatives from the National Family Farm Coalition, and members of the International Assessment of Agricultural Knowledge, Science and Technology for Development. After a meeting in Washington, DC in 2009, the Alliance was established to mobilize and educate US and international activists on the food crisis. The Alliance met at the United States Social Forum in 2010, and has been meeting annually ever since.

== Food Sovereignty Prize ==
The Food Sovereignty Prize is awarded annually to grassroots activists working for a more democratic food system. Awarded by the US Food Sovereignty Alliance, the Food Sovereignty Prize was developed to oppose the World Food Prize, which was founded by "the father of the Green Revolution", Norman Borlaug. The Prize challenges the idea that global hunger, poverty and suffering can be alleviated purely through promoting more agribusiness and aquaculture. Instead, the Prize advocates for those who work to eliminate unequal distribution of wealth and resources, and overturn destructive political, economic, and social policies to open better access to food to communities in need.

The Food Sovereignty Prize is awarded to groups who are active in four areas:

1. Raising public awareness, organizing on-the-ground action, and/or developing and implementing programs and policies,
2. Recognizing the importance of collective action in bringing about social change,
3. Building global linkages into their work, and
4. Prioritizing the leadership of women, indigenous peoples, people of color, migrant workers and other food providers marginalized by the global food system.

Past honorees include:

- 2014: Union of Agricultural Work Committees (UAWC) of Palestine, Community to Community Development/Comunidad a Comunidad (C2C)
- 2013: Group of 4, Dessalines Brigade/Via Campesina
- 2012: Korean Women's Peasant Association
- 2011: Landless Workers Movement of Brazil
- 2010: Family Farm Defenders
- 2009: La Via Campesina
