= Gross household product =

Gross household product (GHP) is a specific estimation of the economic value added by the unpaid work and capital of households. It does not include many of the additional factors typically included in GPI determinations but focuses specifically on the "household economy". Per Jeremy Greenwood et al., GHP is overlooked by many people and seen as unimportant.

== Household production ==
Factors that contribute to GHP include healthcare, the environment, government, and community.

== Measurement ==
The measurement of GHP is dependent on the calculation of unpaid labour and the value of the households assets. There is no official standardized form of measurement and has several ways that it can be measured.

The 'housekeeper wage' approach is the most commonly used. This measurement calculates the value of GHP through determining the cost of paying for household work to be completed.

The ‘specialist wage approach' calculates the cost of hiring a specialist service to perform individual tasks in the household. This can include cooking, laundry and gardening.

A third method of calculating gross household product calculates the opportunity cost of cost of paying. This looks at the monetary value the is sacrificed by working at home, and therefore the GHP figure is determined.
