= Global care chain =

Concept in sociology

A global care chain is a globalized labor market for workers who provide care-intensive labor, such as childcare, eldercare and healthcare. The term was coined by the feminist sociologist Arlie Hochschild. The movement of these workers is an important topic for research and policy development since the number of international migrants around the world has grown substantially since the 1990s.

== Details ==
The concept of a global care chain is usually referenced in studies of development, including the United Nations Development Program, which explains that this type of labor is important for the economic development of a country. Care-intensive labor often falls on women due to gender-stereotypes. Many examples exist of women in developing countries emigrating to more developed countries to help provide for their families back home by sending remittances. Migrant workers may fill gaps in the labor market of developed countries, or may help fulfill domestic duties in dual-income households abroad. This mass migration often has detrimental impacts on poorer countries, creating transnational families and loss of formal workers to care for elders, children and the sick within migrant countries.

As Ehrenreich and Hochschild point out in their book, women workers emigrate for both economic and non-economic factors. While some want to improve their living conditions, others might just want to leave an unhappy marriage or avoid the responsibilities of taking care of the elders at home.

== Case studies ==
=== Case study of Filipinos in Italy ===
Italy has had a great influx of 30 to 45 year old Filipina migrants since 1970. This is due to the demand for care workers within Italy since the country does not have a strong welfare and social service program set in place. Thus Filipinas often travel to Italy, the global north, in search of opportunities, but it is common for Filipina migrants to be able to only uphold temporary jobs that are poorly paid, since they are rarely offered permanent contracts. This causes Filipinas to be caught within the global care chain, in which they work low wage, care-intensive jobs so that they are able to send remittances back home. In 2008, the Philippines received $17 billion in the form of remittances, placing the country as the fourth highest remittance-receiving country.

=== Case study of African female health workers ===
At the turn of this century, about 130,000 health professionals born in Africa were employed abroad. A case study of African migrant women revealed that many physicians and nurses trained in African countries have been underutilized by countries they migrate to since their training and education is not considered legitimate. To be qualified to perform their chosen health professions abroad, they usually need to repeat years' worth of training as well as other exams and certifications. This was true for people who had remained in the Global South or who had migrated to the Global North. Many of these women had to leave the field of healthcare or accept positions with less responsibility than they had when they worked in their original countries of origin. A large proportion of them experienced discrimination in their newly acquired positions as caregivers, whether they remained health workers or were forced to pursue other careers.

== See also ==
- Human capital flight
- Migrant worker
