= Socialist feminism =

Ideology that seeks liberation from economic and cultural sources of women's oppression

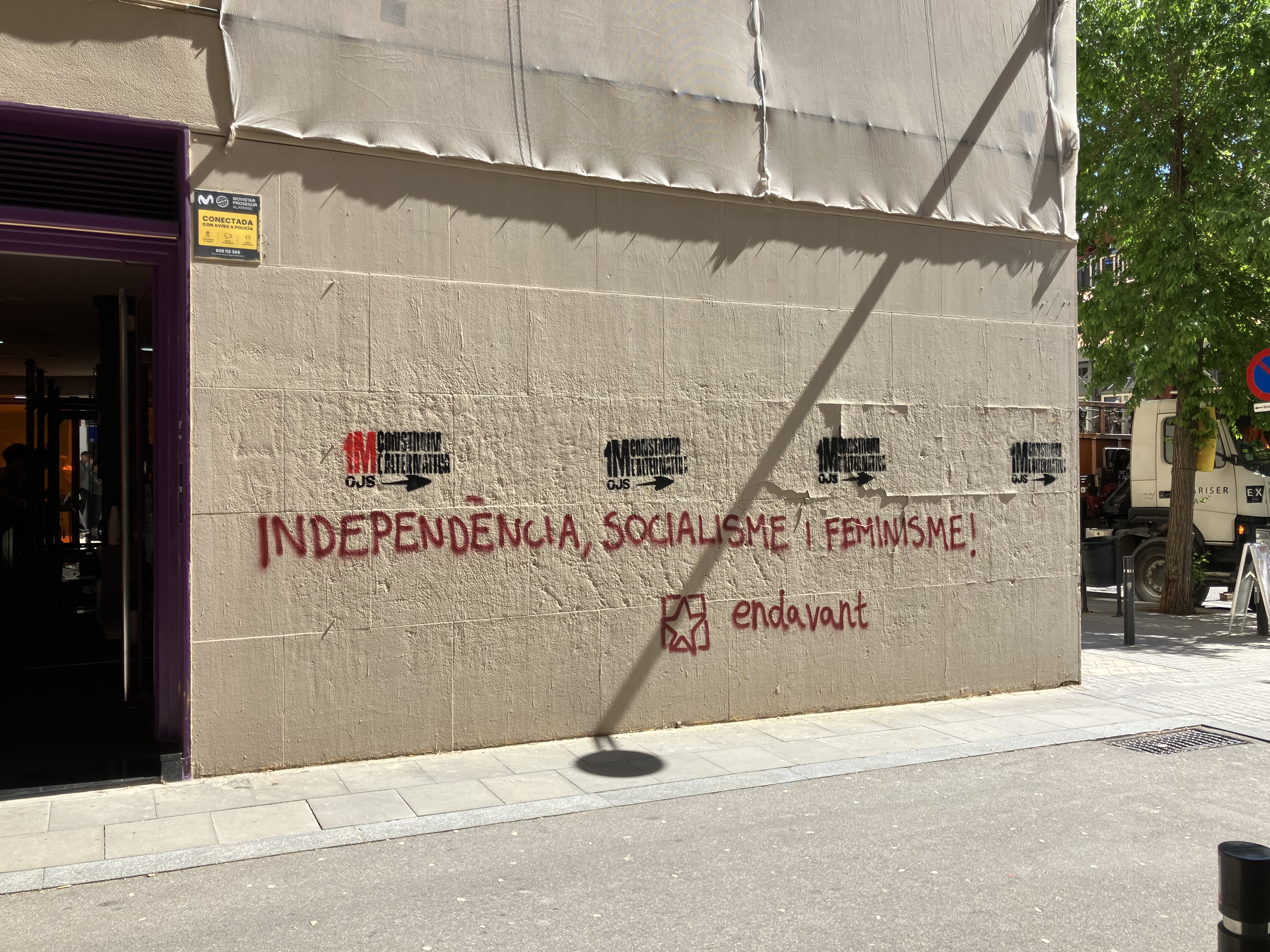
Socialist feminist street art in Barcelona Spain, 2026

Socialist feminism rose in the 1960s and 1970s as an offshoot of the feminist movement and New Left that focuses upon the interconnectivity of the patriarchy and capitalism. However, the ways in which women's private, domestic, and public roles in society has been conceptualized, or thought about, can be traced back to Mary Wollstonecraft's A Vindication of the Rights of Woman (1792) and William Thompson's utopian socialist work in the 19th century. Ideas about overcoming the patriarchy by coming together in female groups to talk about personal problems stem from Carol Hanisch. This was done in an essay in 1969 which later coined the term 'the personal is political.' This was also the time that second wave feminism started to surface which is really when socialist feminism kicked off. Socialist feminists argue that liberation can only be achieved by working to end both the economic and cultural sources of women's oppression.

Socialist feminism is a two-pronged theory that broadens Marxist feminism's argument for the role of capitalism in the oppression of women and radical feminism's theory of the role of gender and the patriarchy. Socialist feminists reject radical feminism's main claim that patriarchy is the only, or primary, source of oppression of women. Rather, Socialist feminists assert that women are oppressed due to their financial dependence on males. Women are subjects to male domination within capitalism due to an uneven balance in wealth. They see economic dependence as the driving force of women's subjugation to men. Further, Socialist feminists see women's liberation as a necessary part of a larger quest for social, economic, and political justice. Socialist feminists attempted to integrate the fight for women's liberation with the struggle against other oppressive systems based on race, class, sexual orientation, or economic status.

Socialist feminism draws upon many concepts found in Marxism, such as a historical materialist point of view, which means that they relate their ideas to the material and historical conditions of people's lives. Thus, Socialist feminists consider how the sexism and gendered division of labor of each historical era is determined by the economic system of the time. Those conditions are largely expressed through capitalist and patriarchal relations. Socialist feminists reject the Orthodox Marxist notion that class and class struggle are the only defining aspects of history and economic development. Although Marx may have prioritised class oppression as the subject of his study and did not talk about female emancipation often, he did treat it as an issue in its own right. One place that this is shown is in his third Parisian manuscript of 1844, where he states that "marriage is a form of exclusive private property", and condones treating women "as the prey and servant of social lust". Despite some claims, he has never been found to argue that the creation of a classless society would lead to gender oppression vanishing; instead evidence exists which suggest that he viewed female struggles as something independent. However, due to his writing on women being scarce, the tradition and works of Marxist Feminism is one constructed through the works of the many feminist Marxists that came after; either through reinterpreting his original writings or providing their own theories to the foundation he provided. Much of this work has gone towards specifying how gender and class work together to create distinct forms of oppression and privilege for women and men of each class. For example, they observe that women's class status is generally derivative of her husband's class or occupational status, e.g. a secretary that marries her boss assumes his class status.

In 1972, "Socialist Feminism: A Strategy for the Women's Movement", which is believed to be the first publication to use the term socialist feminism, was published by the Hyde Park Chapter of the Chicago Women's Liberation Union (Heather Booth, Day Creamer, Susan Davis, Deb Dobbin, Robin Kaufman, and Tobey Klass). Other socialist feminists, notably two long-lived American organizations Radical Women and the Freedom Socialist Party, point to the classic Marxist writings of Frederick Engels (The Origin of the Family, Private Property and the State) and August Bebel (Woman and Socialism) as a powerful explanation of the link between gender oppression and class exploitation. In the decades following the Cold War, feminist writer and scholar Sarah Evans says that the socialist feminist movement has lost traction in the West due to a common narrative that associates socialism with totalitarianism and dogma.

Post-1970, the socialist feminist movement continued to grow. In "Socialist Women: European Socialist Feminism in the Nineteenth & early Twentieth Centuries," by Elizabeth Lapovsky Kennedy, social feminism is defined as "women who saw the root of sexual oppression in the existence of private property and who envisioned a radically transformed society in which man would exploit neither man nor women" The equality described has to do with a transformed society in which both sexes are equal and given the same opportunities despite any physiological differences. Going forward it is described to need a total change in both the economic and social system to create the lasting improvement that the socialist feminism movement is looking for.

Kristen Ghodsee argues in her book Why Women Have Better Sex Under Socialism that free markets discriminate against women as big bosses consider women to be less reliable, weaker and more emotional which leads to the gender pay gap as they need financial incentives to employ them. George Bernard Shaw quotes "Capitalism acts on women as a continual bribe to enter into sex relations for money". He also claims many women take part in work within the household but this is invisible as far as the market is concerned.

== Core issues ==
=== Intersectionality ===
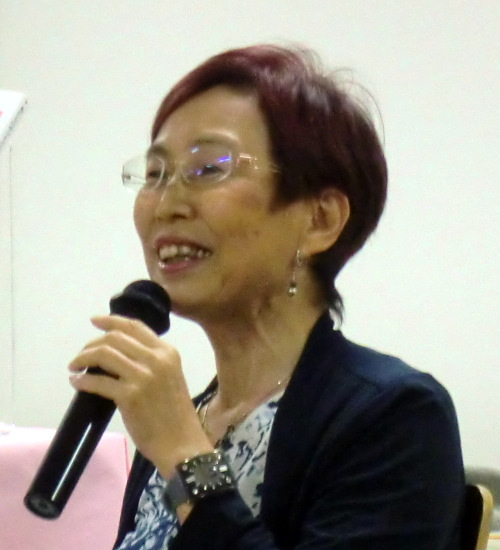
Ueno Chizuko, giving a talk at the University of Tokyo, in 2014

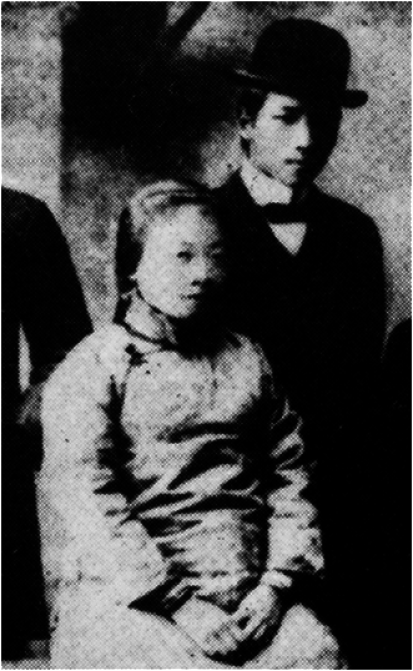
He Zhen, socialist feminist, born in 1884

Socialist feminist Claudia Jones worked to incorporate Black women, other working women of color, and their needs into The Communist Party in the 1930s. This is because The Communist Party tended to default to issues of the white, male proletariat. Jones theoretical background rests at the intersection of Marxism, Black Nationalism, and Feminism and she is credited with theorizing triple oppression, the concept that Black and Brown women experience oppression based on race, class, and gender. Jones further argues that white women, much less Black and Brown working women, would never be liberated if the structures of colonialism were not abolished and Black Nationalism were not adopted.

Feminist historian Linda Gordon asserts that socialist feminism is inherently intersectional, at least to a certain degree, because it takes into account both gender and class. Gordon says that because the foundation of socialist feminism rests on multiple axes, socialist feminism has a history of intersectionality that can be traced back to a period decades before Kimberlé Crenshaw first articulated the concept of intersectionality in 1989. According to Gordon, socialist feminism of the 1980s presaged the concept of intersectionality by examining the overlapping structures that produce an individual's experience of oppression. Feminist scholar and women's studies professor Elizabeth Lapovsky Kennedy says that this broader analysis of societal structures began with socialist feminism and served as a catalyst for feminist scholarship. Kennedy says that many of the first women's studies programs were established by socialist feminist theorists. Despite the claims of being a homogenizing philosophy that erases difference of identity, socialist feminism's inherent approach to difference of identities, through an analysis of economic exploitation of all, is both recognized and enhanced by Crenshaw's intersectionality.

Despite the alleged presence of intersectionality in socialist feminism, many feminists, particularly women of color, critique the movement for perceived deficiencies in regards to racial equity. In Kennedy's account of socialist feminism's impact on women's studies, she says that a lack of Black voices in feminist academia contributed to whitewashing of women's studies programs and courses. Kum-Kum Bhavani, a professor at University of California Santa Barbara, and Margaret Coulson, a socialist feminist scholar, assert that racism in the socialist feminist movement stems from the failure of many white feminists to recognize the institutional nature of racism. According to Bhavani and Coulson, race, class, and gender are inextricably linked, and the exclusion of any one of these factors from one's worldview would result in an incomplete understanding of the systems of privilege and oppression they say constitute our society. Kathryn Harriss, a feminist scholar from the United Kingdom, describes what she sees as the shortcomings of the socialist feminist movement of the 1980s in the United Kingdom. Harriss describes marginalized women's grievances with the Women's Liberation Movement. She says many lesbian women criticized the movement for its domination by heterosexual feminists who perpetuated heterosexism in the movement. Similarly, Black women asserted that they were deprived a voice due to the overwhelming majority of white women in the WLM advocating widely held views regarding violence against women, the family, and reproductive rights that failed to account for the distinct struggles faced by women of color.

=== Motherhood and the private sphere ===
Theorists Anna Wheeler and William Thompson, in The Appeal of One Half the Human Race, Women, Against the Pretensions of the Other Half, Men, to Retain Them in Political, and thence in Civil and Domestic Slavery, published in 1825, describe how women's work contributes to capitalism's continuance. They assert that cooking, cleaning, doing laundry, and all other activities that are deemed domestic work do constitute as actual work. Wheeler and Thompson assert that people, or labor, are needed for capitalism to function and that without women producing children as well as fulfilling these domestic activities, capitalism would fail.

Flora Tristian, French socialist activist, in her piece "Why I mention Women" published in 1843, argued that women and girls do not receive education because they are tasked with domestic duties. Girls and women, according to Tristan, thus cannot obtain gainful employment outside of the domestic sphere due to their neglect in their education and forced preoccupation with cleaning, cooking, and tending to children.

Socialist feminists highlight how motherhood and the gendered division of labor grows "naturally" from women's role as mothers, is the source of women's exclusion from the public sphere, and creates women's economic dependence on men. They assert that there is nothing natural about the gendered division of labor and show that the expectation that women perform all or most reproductive labor, i.e. labor associated with birthing and raising children but also the cleaning, cooking, and other tasks necessary to support human life, deny women the capacity to participate fully in economic activity outside the home. In order to free themselves from the conditions of work as a mother and housekeeper, socialist feminists such as Charlotte Perkins Gilman saw the professionalization of housework as key. This would be done by hiring professional nannies and housekeepers to take the load of domestic work away from the woman in the house. Perkins Gilman also recommended the redesign of homes in ways that would maximize their potential for creativity and leisure for women as well as men, i.e. emphasizing the need for rooms like studios and studies and eliminating kitchens and dining rooms. These changes would necessitate the communalization of meal preparation and consumption outside the home and free women from their burden of providing meals on a house-by-house scale.

=== Toxic masculinity ===
Toxic Masculinity is a specific but not uncommon form of masculinity that depends on traditional patriarchal gender roles that inherently place men over women. What makes it a particularly harmful ideology is due to its promotion of misogyny, patriarchy, physical & sexual aggression towards women and emotional isolation. This directly threatens the physical safety of women and girls, as well as the health of men and boys. This is because toxic masculinity is performative by nature; if you fail to meet the standards of the ideology then you are perceived as a weaker/less valuable man. This leads to men under utilizing physical and mental treatments while at the same time increasing the risk of injury to these areas. Socialist feminists like all other feminist groups agree that toxic masculinity is a harmful set of practices that should be abolished alongside the patriarchy.

Social media also plays a role in toxic masculinity's affect on men, those who subscribe to toxic masculinity are more likely to report negative experiences on social media. This is because these certain types of men are believed to actively search for opportunities to assert themselves in online spaces, this combined with the fact social media usage is often linked with depression serves to only damage the men and the victims of these men significantly.

Toxic masculinity is not specific to any specific country or culture, different places around the world have their own words to describe toxic masculine behaviors. The word and concept Machismo is an example of this, it is primarily used in Spanish speaking countries and describes behavior that not only promotes misogyny, enforces traditional gender roles while glorifying masculinity and disregarding femininity.

=== Gender pay gap ===
Socialist feminist theories have been used to highlight the economic disparities amongst women on a global scale. Contemporary socialist feminists have shifted their concerns from uncompensated house labor to the insufficient pay women receive for work done outside the home. Although some women have secured high-paying male-dominated jobs, most find work in service, clerical, agriculture, and light industrial work. Feminist philosopher Rosemarie Tong presents three common reasons for the gender wage gap: "the concentration of women in low-paying, female-dominated jobs; the high percentage of women who work part-time rather than full-time; and outright wage discrimination against women."

The gender pay gap has been produced and sustained through patriarchal and capitalist conditions. The feminization and devaluation of service-based jobs have subjected women to low wages. The lack of access women have to alternative employment which may harbor higher pay, has increased the wage gap. Households that cannot hire additional aid for domestic duties limit the hours women are able to work outside their homes—having to do both outside and inside labor results in the uncompensated "second shift", expanding the gap. Women's work is considered "secondary wages" under patriarchy. Even women who can work full-time and do the same jobs as men are not paid equally. Tong claims that "women are paid less simply because they are women, a very disturbing thought to say the least."

The gender pay gap is an issue that is especially prevalent in the United States. In Feminist Policy and Human Nature, Allison Jagger describes the biological differences between women and men that would affect job performance namely "Most evidently, women's reproductive functions may mean that women have needs for pregnancy leave, maternity services and arrangements for easy access to their nursing babies." This fact insists that it is not only important but it is necessary for the workplace to incorporate this fairly into contracts. Forcing women to take unpaid maternity leave goes into the issue of the gender wage gap since women have reproductive needs that go far beyond men but are not compensated for that.

In 2017, there was an international women's strike protesting the unfair treatment of women in today's society. The strike included over 50 countries and occurred on international women's day. The strikes in each country were focused on an injustice in that specific country. In the United States women protested by not working or spending money to show how much influence women have.

== Sub-theories of socialist feminism ==
=== Anarcha-feminism ===
Anarcha-feminism, also called anarchist feminism and anarcho-feminism, combines anarchism with feminism. It generally views patriarchy as a manifestation of involuntary coercive hierarchy that should be replaced by decentralized free association. Anarcha-feminists believe that the struggle against patriarchy is an essential part of class struggle, and the anarchist struggle against the state. In essence, the philosophy sees anarchist struggle as a necessary component of feminist struggle and vice versa. L. Susan Brown claims that "as anarchism is a political philosophy that opposes all relationships of power, it is inherently feminist". Bakunin opposed patriarchy and the way the law "subjects [women] to the absolute domination of the man". He argued that "[e]qual rights must belong to men and women" so that women can "become independent and be free to forge their own way of life". Bakunin foresaw the end of "the authoritarian juridical family" and "the full sexual freedom of women."

Anarcha-feminism began with late 19th and early 20th century authors and theorists such as anarchist feminists Emma Goldman, Voltairine de Cleyre and Lucy Parsons. In the Spanish Civil War, an anarcha-feminist group, Mujeres Libres (Free Women) linked to the Federación Anarquista Ibérica, organized to defend both anarchist and feminist ideas, while the prominent Spanish anarchist and feminist leader Federica Montseny held that the "emancipation of women would lead to a quicker realization of the social revolution" and that "the revolution against sexism would have to come from intellectual and militant 'future-women.' According to this Nietzschean concept of Federica Montseny's, women could realize through art and literature the need to revise their own roles."

In Argentina, Virginia Bolten is responsible for the publication of a newspaper called La Voz de la Mujer (The Woman's Voice), which was published nine times in Rosario between 8 January 1896 and 1 January 1897, and was revived, briefly, in 1901. A similar paper with the same name was reportedly published later in Montevideo, which suggests that Bolten may also have founded and edited it after her deportation. "La Voz de la Mujer described itself as "dedicated to the advancement of Communist Anarchism". Its central theme was that of the multiple nature of women's oppression. An editorial asserted, "We believe that in present-day society nothing and nobody has a more wretched situation than unfortunate women." Women, they said, were doubly oppressed—by bourgeois society and by men. Its feminism can be seen from its attack on marriage and upon male power over women. Its contributors, like anarchist feminists elsewhere, developed a concept of oppression that focused on gender oppression. Marriage was a bourgeois institution which restricted women's freedom, including their sexual freedom. Marriages entered into without love, fidelity maintained through fear rather than desire, oppression of women by men they hated—all were seen as symptomatic of the coercion implied by the marriage contract. It was this alienation of the individual's will that the anarchist feminists deplored and sought to remedy, initially through free love and then, and more thoroughly, through social revolution."

Mujeres Libres was an anarchist women's organization in Spain that aimed to empower working class women. It was founded in 1936 by Lucía Sánchez Saornil, Mercedes Comaposada and Amparo Poch y Gascón and had approximately 30,000 members. The organization was based on the idea of a "double struggle" for women's liberation and social revolution and argued that the two objectives were equally important and should be pursued in parallel. In order to gain mutual support, they created networks of women anarchists. Flying day-care centres were set up in efforts to involve more women in union activities. Lucía Sánchez Saornil, was a Spanish poet, militant anarchist and feminist. She is best known as one of the founders of Mujeres Libres and served in the Confederación Nacional del Trabajo (CNT) and Solidaridad Internacional Antifascista (SIA). By 1919, she had been published in a variety of journals, including Los Quijotes, Tableros, Plural, Manantial and La Gaceta Literaria. Working under a male pen name, she was able to explore lesbian themes at a time when homosexuality was criminalized and subject to censorship and punishment. Writing in anarchist publications such as Earth and Freedom, the White Magazine and Workers' Solidarity, Lucía outlined her perspective as a feminist.

In the past decades, two films have been produced about anarcha-feminism. Libertarias is a historical drama made in 1996 about the Spanish anarcha-feminist organization Mujeres Libres. In 2010, the Argentinian film Ni dios, ni patrón, ni marido was released which is centered on the story of anarcha-feminist Virginia Bolten and her publishing of La Voz de la Mujer.

=== Marxist feminism ===
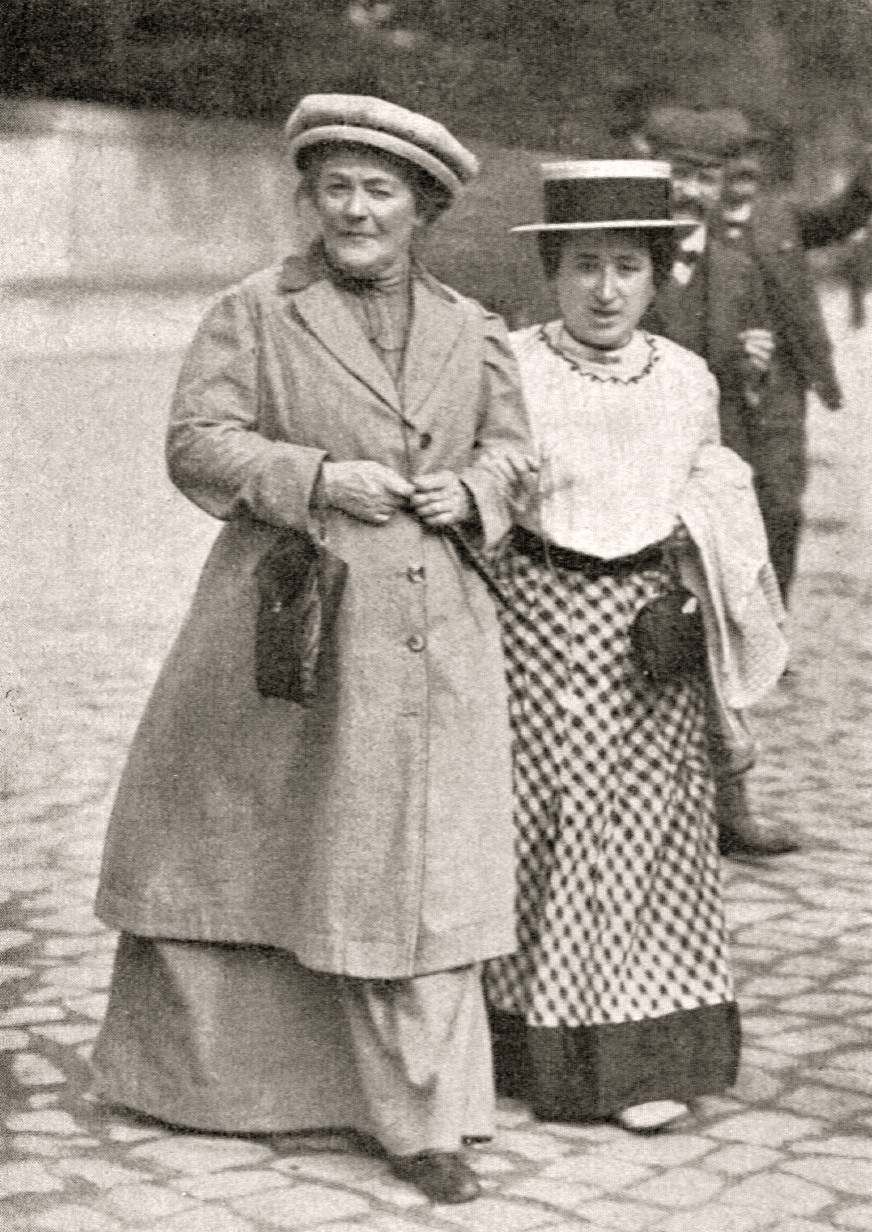
Socialist feminist Clara Zetkin and Rosa Luxemburg in 1910

Marxist feminism is a sub-type of feminist theory which focuses on the social institutions of private property and capitalism to explain and criticize gender inequality and oppression. According to Marxist feminists, private property gives rise to economic inequality, dependence, political and domestic struggle between the sexes, and is the root of women's oppression in the current social context.

Marxist feminism's foundation is laid by Friedrich Engels in his analysis of gender oppression in The Origin of the Family, Private Property, and the State (1884). He argues that a woman's subordination is not a result of her biological disposition but of social relations, and that men's efforts to achieve their demands for control of women's labor and sexual faculties have gradually solidified and become institutionalized in the nuclear family. Through a Marxist historical perspective, Engels analyzes the widespread social phenomena associated with female sexual morality, such as fixation on virginity and sexual purity, incrimination and violent punishment of women who commit adultery, and demands that women be submissive to their husbands. Ultimately, Engels traces these phenomena to the recent development of exclusive control of private property by the patriarchs of the rising slaveowner class in the ancient mode of production, and the attendant desire to ensure that their inheritance is passed only to their own offspring: chastity and fidelity are rewarded, says Engels, because they guarantee exclusive access to the sexual and reproductive faculty of women possessed by men from the property-owning class.

In the late nineteenth and early twentieth centuries, both Clara Zetkin and Eleanor Marx were against the demonization of men and supported a proletariat revolution that would overcome as many male–female inequalities as possible. In this way, a politic of solidarity was seen as the means to enact a socialist platform. As their movement already had the most radical demands in women's equality, most Marxist leaders, including Clara Zetkin and Alexandra Kollontai, counterposed Marxism against bourgeois feminism, rather than trying to combine them.

Orthodox Marxists argue that most Marxist forerunners claimed by feminists or Marxist feminists including Clara Zetkin and Alexandra Kollontai were against capitalist forms of feminism. They agreed with the main Marxist movement that feminism was a bourgeois ideology counterposed to Marxism and against the working class. Instead of feminism, the Marxists supported the more radical political program of liberating women through socialist revolution, with a special emphasis on work among women and in materially changing their conditions after the revolution. Orthodox Marxists view the later attempt to combine Marxism and feminism as a liberal creation of academics and reformist leftists who want to make alliances with bourgeois feminists. For instance, Alexandra Kollontai wrote in 1909:

For what reason, then, should the woman worker seek a union with the bourgeois feminists? Who, in actual fact, would stand to gain in the event of such an alliance? Certainly not the woman worker.

Kollontai was a prominent leader in the Bolshevik party in Russia, defending her stance on how capitalism had shaped a rather displeasing and oppressing position for females that are part of its system. She recognized and emphasized the difference between the proletariat and bourgeoise women in society, though it has been expressed by Kollontai's thought that all women under a capitalist economy were those of oppression. One of the reasons Kollontai had a strict opposition of the bourgeois women and proletariat or working-class women to have an alliance is because the bourgeois was still inherently using the women of the working class to their advantage, and therefore prolonging the injustice that women in a capitalist society are treated. She theorized that a well-balanced economic utopia was ingrained in the need for gender equality, but never identified as a feminist, though she greatly impacted the feminist movement within the ideology of feminism within and throughout socialism. Kollontai had a harsh stance on the feminist movement and believed feminist to be naïve in only addressing gender as the reason inequality was happening under a capitalist rule. She believed that the true issue of inequality was that of the division of classes that led to the immediate production of gender struggles, just how men in the structure of the classes shown a harsh divide as well. Kollontai analyzed the theories and historical implications of Marxism as a background for her ideologies, which she addressed the most profound obstacle for society to address be that of the gender inequality, which could never be eradicated under a capitalist society. As capitalism is inherently for private profit, Kollontai's argument toward the eradication of women suffrage within society under a capitalist rule also delved into how women cannot and will not be abolished under a capitalist society because of the ways in which women's "free labor" has been utilized. Kollontai criticized the feminist movement as also neglecting to emphasize how the working class, while trying to care and provide for a family and being paid less than that of men, was still expected to cater to and provide for the bourgeois or upper-class women who were still oppressing the working-class women by utilizing their stereotypical type of work. Kollontai also faced harsh scrutiny in being a woman leader in a time of a male dominated political stance during the Bolshevik movement. In keeping with her unusual position during her time, she also kept diaries of her plans and ideas on moving towards a more "modern" society where socialism would help uproot that of capitalism and the oppression that different groups of gender and class had been facing. Kollontai was a great example of a woman who was indeed still oppressed by the times and was removed from her own ideologies and progress for the mere fact she was a woman in times where being so in a powerful position was frowned upon and "great women" were only allowed to be placed alongside "great men" in history. Kollontai's most pertinent presence in feminist socialism was her stance on reproductive rights and her view on women being allowed the same luxuries that men have in finding love not only to be stable and supported, and to also be able to make their own money and be secure on their own two feet. She focused her attention on opening up society's allowance of women's liberation from a capitalist and bourgeois control and emphasizing women's suffrage in the working-class.

A pioneering Marxist and feminist, Mary Inman of the Communist Party USA challenged the party's orthodox position by arguing that the home is a center of production and housewives carry out productive labor. Her writings include In Woman's Defense (1940) and Woman-Power (1942). Inman's work was at first warmly received by several top Communist women leaders, including Elizabeth Gurley Flynn and Ella Reeve Bloor, but the CPUSA leadership began an official attack on Inman's work for purported ideological deviation in 1941. A series of articles written against Inman's ideas appeared in the party's literary monthly, The New Masses, and the polemic was extended with the publication of a pamphlet by A. Landy, Marxism and the Woman Question.

Radical Women, a major Marxist-feminist organization, bases its theory on Marx' and Engels' analysis that the enslavement of women was the first building block of an economic system based on private property. They contend that elimination of the capitalist profit-driven economy will remove the motivation for sexism, racism, homophobia, and other forms of oppression.

== Later theoretical works ==
=== Zillah R. Eisenstein ===
Capitalist Patriarchy and the Case for Socialist Feminism was a collection of essays assembled and anthologized by Zillah R. Eisenstein in 1978.

Sociologist and academic Rhonda F. Levine cites Eisenstein's work as a "superb discussion of the socialist-feminist position" in her anthology Enriching the Sociological Imagination: How Radical Sociology Changed the Discipline. Levine goes on to describe the book as "one of the earliest statements of how a Marxist class analysis can combine with a feminist analysis of patriarchy to produce a theory of how gender and class intersect as systems of inequality".

Eisenstein defines the term 'capitalist patriarchy' as "descriptive of the 'mutually reinforcing dialectical relationship between capitalist class structure and hierarchical sexual structuring."

She believes: "The recognition of women as a sexual class lays the subversive quality of feminism for liberalism because liberalism is premised upon women's exclusion from public life on this very class basis. The demand for real equality of women with men, if taken to its logical conclusion, would dislodge the patriarchal structure necessary to a liberal society."

=== Donna Haraway and "A Cyborg Manifesto" ===
In 1985, Donna Haraway published the essay "A Cyborg Manifesto: Science, Technology, and Socialist-Feminism in the Late Twentieth Century" in Socialist Review. Although most of Haraway's earlier work was focused on emphasizing the masculine bias in scientific culture, she has also contributed greatly to feminist narratives of the twentieth century. For Haraway, the Manifesto came at a critical juncture at which feminists, in order to have any real-world significance, had to acknowledge their situatedness within what she terms the "informatics of domination". Feminists must, she proclaims, unite behind "an ironic dream of a common language for women in the integrated circuit". Women were no longer on the outside along a hierarchy of privileged binaries but rather deeply imbued, exploited by and complicit within networked hegemony, and had to form their politics as such.

According to Haraway's manifesto, "there is nothing about being female that naturally binds women together into a unified category. There is not even such a state as 'being' female, itself a highly complex category constructed in contested sexual scientific discourses and other social practices" (p. 155). A cyborg does not require a stable, essentialist identity, argues Haraway, and feminists should consider creating coalitions based on "affinity" instead of identity. To ground her argument, Haraway analyzes the phrase "women of colour", suggesting it as one possible example of affinity politics. Using a term coined by theorist Chela Sandoval, Haraway writes that "oppositional consciousness" is comparable with a cyborg politics, because rather than identity it stresses how affinity comes as a result of "otherness, difference, and specificity" (p. 156).

Donna Haraway is the author of A Cyborg Manifesto and it describes a dystopian future in which cyborgs represent the ideal way society would treat people in fixing the way society separates people by gender, race and religion. In her extensive manifesto written in 1991, Haraway explains about a political myth as a "cyborg" who represents the ideal way someone would be treated in society. Haraway's manifesto describes the cyborg as "A cybernetic organism, a hybrid of machine and organism, a creature of social reality as well as a creature of fiction. Social reality is lived social relations, our most important political construction, a world-changing fiction. The international women's movements have constructed 'women's experience', as well as uncovered or discovered this crucial collective object. This experience is a fiction and fact of the most crucial, political kind" Defined as a post-gender world, this cyborg represents the idea that there can by a dystopian future in which gender, religion and race are not dismissed but are not factors in how members of this society treat each other. This manifesto is consistently mentioning the idea of feminism and how feminists aren't looking for more or less than men but to make the playing field equal. This also goes to the socialist feminism point that without a massive change in society the feminist won't be able to get lasting change.

=== Autonomist feminism ===
Leopoldina Fortunati is the author of The Arcana of Reproduction: Housework, Prostitution, Labor and Capital (L'arcano della riproduzione: Casalinghe, prostitute, operai e capitale), a feminist critique of Marx. Fortunati is the author of several books, including The Arcana of Reproduction (Autonomedia, 1995) and I mostri nell'immaginario (Angeli, 1995), and is the editor of Gli Italiani al telefono (Angeli, 1995) and Telecomunicando in Europa (1998), and with J. Katz and R. Riccini Mediating the Human Body. Technology, Communication and Fashion (2003). Her influences include Mariarosa Dalla Costa, Antonio Negri, and Karl Marx.

Silvia Federici is an Italian scholar, teacher, and activist from the radical autonomist feminist Marxist tradition. Federici's best known work, Caliban and the Witch: Women, the Body and Primitive Accumulation, expands on the work of Leopoldina Fortunati. In it, she argues against Karl Marx's claim that primitive accumulation is a necessary precursor for capitalism. Instead, she posits that primitive accumulation is a fundamental characteristic of capitalism itself—that capitalism, in order to perpetuate itself, requires a constant infusion of expropriated capital.

Federici connects this expropriation to women's unpaid labor, both connected to reproduction and otherwise, which she frames as a historical precondition to the rise of a capitalist economy predicated upon wage labor. Related to this, she outlines the historical struggle for the commons and the struggle for communalism. Instead of seeing capitalism as a liberatory defeat of feudalism, Federici interprets the ascent of capitalism as a reactionary move to subvert the rising tide of communalism and to retain the basic social contract.

She situates the institutionalization of rape and prostitution, as well as the heretic and witch-hunt trials, burnings, and torture at the center of a methodical subjugation of women and appropriation of their labor. This is tied into colonial expropriation and provides a framework for understanding the work of the International Monetary Fund, World Bank, and other proxy institutions as engaging in a renewed cycle of primitive accumulation, by which everything held in common—from water, to seeds, to our genetic code—becomes privatized in what amounts to a new round of enclosures.

=== Material feminism ===
Material feminism highlights capitalism and patriarchy as central in understanding women's oppression. The theory centers on social change rather than seeking transformation within the capitalist system. Jennifer Wicke, defines materialist feminism as "a feminism that insists on examining the material conditions under which social arrangements, including those of gender hierarchy, develop [...]. [M]aterialist feminism avoids seeing this gender hierarchy as the effect of a singular [...] patriarchy and instead gauges the web of social and psychic relations that make up a material, historical moment". She states that "materialist feminism argues that material conditions of all sorts play a vital role in the social production of gender and assays the different ways in which women collaborate and participate in these productions". Material feminism also considers how women and men of various races and ethnicities are kept in their lower economic status due to an imbalance of power that privileges those who already have privilege, thereby protecting the status quo.

The term material feminism was first used in 1975 by Christine Delphy. The current concept has its roots in socialist and Marxist feminism; Rosemary Hennessy and Chrys Ingraham, editors of Materialist Feminism: A Reader in Class, Difference, and Women's Lives, describe material feminism as the "conjuncture of several discourses—historical materialism, Marxist and radical feminism, as well as postmodernist and psychoanalytic theories of meaning and subjectivity". The term materialist feminism emerged in the late 1970s and is associated with key thinkers, such as Rosemary Hennessy, Stevi Jackson and Christine Delphy. Rosemary Hennessy traces the history of Materialist Feminism in the work of British and French feminists who preferred the term materialist feminism to Marxist feminism. In their view, Marxism had to be altered to be able to explain the sexual division of labor. Marxism was inadequate to the task because of its class bias and focus on production. Feminism was also problematic due to its essentialist and idealist concept of woman. Material feminism then emerged as a positive substitute to both Marxism and feminism. Material feminism partly originated from the work of French feminists, particularly Christine Delphy. She argued that materialism is the only theory of history that views oppression as a basic reality of women's lives. Delphy states that this is why women and all oppressed groups need materialism to investigate their situation. For Delphy, "to start from oppression defines a materialist approach, oppression is a materialist concept". She states that the domestic mode of production was the site of patriarchal exploitation and the material basis of the oppression of women. Delphy further argued that marriage is a labor contract that gives men the right to exploit women. The Grand Domestic Revolution by Dolores Hayden is a reference. Hayden describes Material feminism at that time as reconceptualizing the relationship between the private household space and public space by presenting collective options to take the "burden" off women in regard to housework, cooking, and other traditional female domestic jobs.

=== Ecological feminism or Ecofeminism ===
In the 1970s, the impacts of post-World War II technological development led many women to organise against issues from the toxic pollution of neighbourhoods to nuclear weapons testing on indigenous lands. This grassroots activism emerging across every continent was both intersectional and cross-cultural in its struggle to protect the conditions for reproduction of Life on Earth. Known as ecofeminism, the political relevance of this movement continues to expand. Classic statements in its literature include Carolyn Merchant, US, The Death of Nature; Maria Mies, Germany, Patriarchy and Accumulation on a World Scale; Vandana Shiva, India, Staying Alive: Women Ecology and Development; Ariel Salleh, Australia, Ecofeminism as Politics: nature, Marx, and the postmodern. Ecofeminism involves a profound critique of Eurocentric epistemology, science, economics, and culture. It is increasingly prominent as a feminist response to the contemporary breakdown of the planetary ecosystem.

== Praxis ==
Socialist feminists believe that women's liberation must be sought in conjunction with the social and economic justice of all people. They see the fight to end male supremacy as key to social justice, but not the only issue, rather one of many forms of oppression that are mutually reinforcing.

=== Women's liberation in real socialism ===
In the forty years of socialism in East Germany, the German Democratic Republic (GDR), many feminist demands were implemented:

- The Constitution of the German Democratic Republic adopted in 1949 ensured full equality between men and women.
- Starting in 1972, with the Law on the interruption of pregnancy, abortion was allowed up until the 12th week and contraception was provided free of charge.
- In the GDR, 9 out of 10 women worked outside the home in a wide range of professions, including teachers, doctors, secretaries, chemists, bus drivers and plumbers. Female labor participation was a key part of the GDR's objectives.
- Universal public childcare from infancy at little or no cost was the norm. Paid maternity and paternity leave and even leave for grandmothers to care for their grandchildren was allowed for up to 20 weeks.

=== Chicago Women's Liberation Union ===
The Chicago Women's Liberation Union (CWLU) was formed in 1969 after a founding conference in Palatine, Illinois. Naomi Weisstein, Vivian Rothstein, Heather Booth, and Ruth Surgal were among the founders. The main goal of the organization was to end gender inequality and sexism, which the CWLU defined as "the systematic keeping down of women for the benefit of people in power". The purpose statement of the organization expressed that "Changing women's position in society isn't going to be easy. It's going to require changes in expectations, jobs, child care, and education. It's going to change the distribution of power over the rest of us to all people sharing power and sharing in the decisions that affect our lives." The CWLU spent almost a decade organizing to challenge both sexism and class oppression. The group is best known for the 1972 pamphlet "Socialist Feminism: A Strategy for the Women's Movement", by the Hyde Park Chapter of the Chicago Women's Liberation Union. Nationally circulated, the publication is believed to be the first to use the term socialist feminism.

The CWLU was organized as an umbrella organization to unite a wide range of work groups and discussion groups. A representative from each work group went to monthly meetings of the Steering Committee to reach consensus on organizational policy and strategy. They addressed a myriad of issues including women's health, reproductive rights, education, economic rights, visual arts and music, sports, lesbian liberation, and more.

=== Women's International Terrorist Conspiracy from Hell ===
Women's International Terrorist Conspiracy from Hell (W.I.T.C.H.) was the name of many related but independent feminist groups formed in the United States during 1968 and 1969 and who were important in the development of socialist feminism. The name W.I.T.C.H. was also sometimes expanded as "Women Inspired to Tell their Collective History", "Women Interested in Toppling Consumer Holidays", and many other variations.

There was no centralized organization; each W.I.T.C.H. group was formed independently by women inspired by the ideas and example of previous actions. Their activism mainly took the form of "zaps", a form of guerrilla theater mixing street theatre and protest, where they used attention-catching and humorous public actions to highlight political and economic complaints against companies and government agencies, frequently involving the use of witch costumes and the chanting of hexes. Witches often appeared as stock characters in feminist Left theatre, representing the misogynist crone stereotype.

On Halloween 1968, women from W.I.T.C.H. staged a "hex" of Wall Street at a branch of Chase Manhattan Bank, wearing rags and fright makeup; Robin Morgan stated that the Dow Jones Industrial Average declined sharply the next day. The DJIA did not decline sharply, and experienced a rise over the next several days and weeks. In December 1968 W.I.T.C.H targeted both the House Un-American Activities Committee and the Chicago Eight, saying that they conspired to treat only men as "leaders" of the antiwar movement. In 1969, W.I.T.C.H. held a protest at a "Bridal Fair" at Madison Square Garden. Members wore black veils. They handed out pamphlets titled "Confront the Whoremakers", chanted "Here come the slaves/Off to their graves", and had a mock "unwedding" ceremony. The protests also involved turning loose several white mice at the event, which Fair attendees began scooping up off the ground. The event resulted in negative media coverage for W.I.T.C.H., and some dissention among members over goals and tactics. In February 1970, the Washington coven (W.I.T.C.H. chapters were called "covens") held a protest during a Senate hearing on population control. They interrupted Texas Senator Ralph Yarborough's testimony by chanting and throwing pills at panel members and people in the audience galleries. Spin-off "covens" were founded in Chicago, Illinois, and Washington, D.C., and W.I.T.C.H. zaps continued until roughly the beginning of 1970. The "zap" protests used by W.I.T.C.H. may have helped inspire the zap action protest tactics adopted shortly afterwards by LGBT activists, and still in use.

=== Big Flame ===
Big Flame was "a revolutionary socialist feminist organisation with a working-class orientation" in the United Kingdom. Founded in Liverpool in 1970, the group initially grew rapidly, with branches appearing in some other cities. Its publications emphasised that "a revolutionary party is necessary but Big Flame is not that party, nor is it the embryo of that party". The group was influenced by the Italian Lotta Continua group.

The group published a magazine, Big Flame; and a journal, Revolutionary Socialism. Members were active at the Ford plants at Halewood and Dagenham and devoted a great deal of time to self-analysis and considering their relationship with the larger Trotskyist groups. In time, they came to describe their politics as libertarian Marxist. In 1978, they joined the Socialist Unity electoral coalition, led by the Trotskyist International Marxist Group. In 1980, the anarchists of the Libertarian Communist Group joined Big Flame. The Revolutionary Marxist Current also joined at about this time. However, as more members of the group defected to the Labour Party, the journal ceased to appear in 1982, and the group was wound up in about 1984. Ex-members of the group were involved in the launch of the mass-market tabloid newspaper the News on Sunday in 1987, which folded the same year. The name of the group was taken from a television play, The Big Flame (1969), written by Jim Allen and directed by Ken Loach for the BBC's Wednesday Play season. It dealt with a fictional strike and work-in at the Liverpool Docks.

== Theorists ==
- Johanna Brenner
- Barbara Ehrenreich
- Angela Davis
- Barbara Smith
- Audre Lorde
- Clara Fraser
- Charlotte Perkins Gilman
- Emma Goldman
- Silvia Federici
- Donna Haraway
- Leopoldina Fortunati
- Heidi I. Hartmann
- Selma James
- Carolyn Merchant
- Maria Mies
- Sheila Rowbotham
- Ariel Salleh
- Vandana Shiva
- Sylvia Walby
- Nellie Wong
- Nancy Fraser
- Ruth Neto

== Socialist feminist groups ==
- Pan y Rosas
- Bread and Roses of Boston
- Chicago Women's Liberation Union
- Radical Women
- Freedom Socialist Party
- ROSA International Socialist Feminists
- Women's Fightback (a socialist feminist magazine by the Alliance for Workers' Liberty, linked to their socialist feminist book clubs across the UK, their annual socialist feminist day school 'All The Rage', and their other socialist feminist projects)

== See also ==
- Anarcha-feminism
- Capitalist Patriarchy and the Case for Socialist Feminism
- Ecofeminism
- Feminist theory
- History of feminism
- Jineology
- Marxist feminism
- Material feminism
