= Marxist feminism =

Marxist feminism is a philosophical variant of feminism that incorporates and extends Marxist theory. Marxist feminism analyzes the ways in which women are exploited through capitalism and the individual ownership of private property. According to Marxist feminists, women's liberation can only be achieved by dismantling the capitalist systems in which they contend much of women's labor is uncompensated. Marxist feminists extend traditional Marxist analysis by applying it to unpaid domestic labor and sex relations.

Because of its foundation in historical materialism, Marxist feminism is similar to socialist feminism and, to a greater degree, materialist feminism. The latter two place greater emphasis on what they consider the "reductionist limitations" of Marxist theory but, as Martha E. Gimenez notes in her exploration of the differences between Marxist and materialist feminism, "clear lines of theoretical demarcation between and within these two umbrella terms are somewhat difficult to establish."

Marxist feminism is an offshoot of Feminist theory that argues that capitalism is the main contributor to women's oppression. Marxist feminists typically see capitalism and patriarchy as interconnected systems that mutually reinforce one another. In this framework, capitalism relies significantly on the unpaid domestic labor performed by women, which is often undervalued and neglected. This exploitation is seen as perpetuating and strengthening the patriarchal structures embedded in our society. By highlighting how women's labor is essential to the functioning of capitalist economies, Marxist feminism reveals the impact of gendered inequalities and calls for a critical examination of both economic and social systems. Marxist feminism continues to be relevant today for examining the intersection of gender and political economy, particularly in how the social reproduction of individuals and communities perpetuates capitalism.

Elizabeth Armstrong^{[2]} proposes that Marxist feminism theorizes subjectivity and possibilities for an anti-capitalist future with key elements such as imperialism, primitive accumulation, theft of land, resources, and women's unpaid labor to the reproduction of lives and generations. Marxist feminism challenges the precedence of capitalist value to regulate social values including the exchange value in wages and profit by making the value of reproductive labor visible.^{[2]}

== Theoretical background in Marxism ==
Marxism follows the development of oppression and class division in the evolution of human society through the development and organization of wealth and production, and concludes the evolution of oppressive societal structure to be relative to the evolution of oppressive family structures, i.e., the normalization of oppressing the female sex marks or coincides with the birth of oppressive society in general.

In The Origin of the Family, Private Property, and the State (1884), Friedrich Engels writes about the earliest origins of the family structure, social hierarchy, and the concept of wealth, drawing from both ancient and contemporary study. He concludes that women originally had a higher social status and equal consideration in labor, and particularly, only women were sure to share a family name. As the earliest men did not even share the family name, Engels says, they did not know for sure who their children were or benefit from inheritance.

When agriculture first became abundant and the abundance was considered male wealth, as it was sourced from the male work environment away from the home, a deeper wish for male lineage and inheritance was founded. To achieve that wish, women were not only granted their long-sought monogamy but forced into it as part of domestic servitude, while males pursued a hushed culture of "hetaerism". Engels describes this situation as coincidental to the beginnings of forced servitude as a dominant feature of society, leading eventually to a European culture of class oppression, where the children of the poor were expected to be servants of the rich.

Engels and Marx in 1846 had written: "The first division of labor is that between man and woman for the propagation of children." Here he reframes this to say: "The first class opposition that appears in history coincides with the development of the antagonism between man and woman in monogamous marriage, and the first class oppression coincides with that of the female sex by the male."

Gender oppression is reproduced culturally and maintained through institutionalized inequality. By privileging men at the expense of women and refusing to acknowledge traditional domestic labor as equally valuable, the working-class man is socialized into an oppressive structure which marginalizes the working-class woman.

The original Marxist theory was not centered around the specific challenges faced by women. However, over time, it became evident that within a capitalist system, women experienced a distinct form of exploitation. This exploitation entailed reproductive and emotional labor, where women were often unrecognized and unpaid for their vital contributions. Their roles in caregiving, nurturing, and sustaining family life were rendered invisible, highlighting a critical oversight in the traditional Marxist discourse on labor and value. Karl Marx and Friedrich Engels described the relationship between women and labor as reproductive labor having social forms that consist of marriage and the family, with the labor itself as biological. Additionally, women who performed this labor were established as biological beings who are unable to effect changes in these social order, arguing that social reproduction as labor that exists within the relations of capitalism^{[2]}. As a result of patriarchal norms in society, women did the majority of all reproductive labor in the household under the control of men, therefore reproducing workers, including themselves, to return day after day ready to sell their labor to the capitalist; with that being said, the exchange value women's labor in the household amounts to nothing.

== Marxist feminist critiques of other branches of feminism ==
Clara Zetkin and Alexandra Kollontai were opposed to forms of feminism that reinforce class status. They did not see a true possibility to unite across economic inequality because they argue that it would be extremely difficult for an upper-class woman to truly understand the struggles of the working class. For instance, Kollontai wrote in 1909:

For what reason, then, should the woman worker seek a union with the bourgeois feminists? Who, in actual fact, would stand to gain in the event of such an alliance? Certainly not the woman worker.

Kollontai avoided associating herself with the term "feminism" as she deemed the term to be too closely related to that of the bourgeois feminism that shut out the capability of other classes to benefit from the term.

Kollontai was a prominent leader in the Bolshevik party in Russia, defending her stance on how capitalism had shaped a rather displeasing and oppressing position for women who are part of its system. She recognized and emphasized the difference between the proletariat and bourgeois women in society, though it has been expressed by Kollontai's thought that all women under a capitalist economy were those of oppression. One of the reasons Kollontai had a strict opposition of the bourgeois women and proletariat or working-class women to have an alliance is because the bourgeois was still inherently using the women of the working class to their advantage, and therefore prolonging the injustice that women in a capitalist society are treated. She theorized that a well-balanced economic utopia was ingrained in the need for gender equality, but never identified as a feminist, though she greatly impacted the feminist movement within the ideology of feminism within and throughout socialism. Kollontai had a harsh stance on the feminist movement and believed feminists to be naive in only addressing gender as the reason inequality was happening under a capitalist rule. She believed that the true issue of inequality was that of the division of classes that led to the immediate production of gender struggles, just how men in the structure of the classes shown a harsh divide as well. Kollontai analyzed the theories and historical implications of Marxism as a background for her ideologies, which she addressed the most profound obstacle for society to address be that of the gender inequality, which could never be eradicated under a capitalist society.

As capitalism is inherently for private profit, Kollontai's argument toward the eradication of women suffrage within society under a capitalist rule also delved into how women cannot and will not be abolished under a capitalist society because of the ways in which women's "free labor" has been utilized. Kollontai criticized the feminist movement as also neglecting to emphasize how the working class, while trying to care and provide for a family and being paid less than that of men, was still expected to cater to and provide for the bourgeois or upper-class women who were still oppressing the working-class women by utilizing their stereotypical type of work. Kollontai also faced harsh scrutiny in being a woman leader in a time of a male dominated political stance during the Bolshevik movement. In keeping with her unusual position during her time, she also kept diaries of her plans and ideas on moving towards a more "modern" society where socialism would help uproot that of capitalism and the oppression that different groups of gender and class had been facing. Kollontai was a great example of a woman who was indeed still oppressed by the times and was removed from her own ideologies and progress for the mere fact she was a woman in times when being so in a powerful position was frowned upon and "great women" were only allowed to be placed alongside "great men" in history. Kollontai's most pertinent presence in feminist socialism was her stance on reproductive rights and her view on women being allowed the same luxuries that men have in finding love not only to be stable and supported, and to also be able to make their own money and be secure on their own two feet. She focused her attention on opening up society's allowance of women's liberation from a capitalist and bourgeois control and emphasizing women's suffrage in the working-class.

Critics like Kollontai believed liberal feminism would undermine the efforts of Marxism to improve conditions for the working class. Marxists supported the more radical political program of liberating women through socialist revolution, with a special emphasis on work among women and in materially changing their conditions after the revolution. Additional liberation methods supported by Marxist feminists include radical "Utopian Demands", coined by Maria Mies. This indication of the scope of revolution required to promote change states that demanding anything less than complete reform will produce inadequate solutions to long-term issues.

== Productive, unproductive, and reproductive labor ==
Marx categorized labor into two categories: productive and unproductive.

- Productive labor is labor that creates surplus value, e.g. production of raw materials and manufacturing products.
- Unproductive labor does not create surplus value and may in fact be subsidized by it. This can include supervisory duties, bookkeeping, marketing, etc.

Early Marxist and Socialist feminists began creating working women's organizations within broader worker movements in the early 1910s. These organizers considered the needs of working women to be different to those of the feminist movements that had been developed by the bourgeoisie. Separating gender from class as a means for liberation was unthinkable for these women, and they found various levels of success within communist and socialist parties for their ideas. Marxist feminists such as Mary Inman established networks of likeminded members within these organizations that were able to lobby for women's oppression to be considered a key policy issue by the 1940s.

Marxist feminist authors in the 1970s, such as Margaret Benston and Peggy Morton, relied heavily on analysis of productive and unproductive labor in an attempt to shift the perception of the time that consumption was the purpose of a family, presenting arguments for a state-paid wage to homemakers, and a cultural perception of the family as a productive entity. In capitalism, the work of maintaining a family has little material value, as it produces no marketable products. In Marxism, the maintenance of a family is productive, as it has a service value, and is used in the same sense as a commodity.

=== Social Reproduction ===
Social reproduction is the process of how we create and maintain the workforce in a given economic system. In capitalism, it involves the physical and social aspects of work, the relationships between employers and workers, and the beliefs that support these relationships. This process often takes place within households and relies heavily on traditional tasks performed by women^{[1]}. Social Reproduction is primarily driven by accumulation and continued survival of biological reproduction and societal wellbeing. Modern social reproduction fills gaps in Marx's original theory by recognizing the role of women, particularly in housework, which Marx initially overlooked. In a capitalist society, social reproduction mainly happens through unpaid or low-paid work that isn't limited to the home. Marx pointed out that reproduction includes both creating and maintaining the relationship between the capitalist and the wage-laborer.^{[1]}

=== Wages for housework ===
Focusing on exclusion from productive labor as the most important source of female oppression, some Marxist feminists advocated for the inclusion of domestic work within the waged capitalist economy. The idea of compensating reproductive labor was present in the writing of socialists such as Charlotte Perkins Gilman (1898) who argued that women's oppression stemmed from being forced into the private sphere. Gilman argued that conditions for women would improve when their work was located, recognized, and valued in the public sphere.

Perhaps the most influential effort to compensate reproductive labor was the International Wages for Housework Campaign, an organization launched in Italy in 1972 by members of the International Feminist Collective. Many of these women, including Selma James, Mariarosa Dalla Costa, Brigitte Galtier, and Silvia Federici published a range of sources to promote their message in academic and public domains. Despite beginning as a small group of women in Italy, the Wages for Housework Campaign was successful in mobilizing on an international level. A Wages for Housework group was founded in Brooklyn, New York, with the help of Federici. As Heidi Hartmann acknowledges (1981), the efforts of these movements, though ultimately unsuccessful, generated important discourse regarding the value of housework and its relation to the economy.

In a capitalist society workers receive wages and take profit from their work, and those who reproduce daily and generational life receive no recognition for their labor. Members of a capitalist society are essentially invisible or a burden to the system. Women's work in handicrafts, spinning, subsistence farming, livestock rearing, and other additional agricultural labor became essential for survival where rural area inhabitants depended on wages alone.^{[2]} In a capitalist society, Engels argued that household management lost its public character; thus, it became a matter of private service, with the wife acting as the head servant to the man and the household, creating an exclusionary practice where women are left out from all participation in social production. The concept that women's "enslavement" is biologically predetermined is challenged by the argument that class relations within capitalism play a significant role in enforcing gender hierarchies, which, in turn, contribute to women's oppression. Marxist feminists claim that the intersection between capitalist class relations and the patriarchal structure of the family is a necessary element of capitalism. This intersection creates a system of oppression that requires a thorough analysis and, ultimately, eradication to free women from being non-participants in society that remain subservient to men.^{[2]}

=== Domestic slavery ===
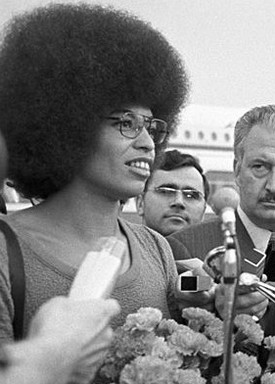
Davis on her 1972 visit to Moscow

Many Marxist feminist scholars analyzing modes of oppression at the site of production note the effect that housework has on women in a capitalist system. In Angela Davis' Women, Race and Class, the concept of housework is utilized to deconstruct the capitalist construct of gendered labor within the home and to show the ways in which women are exploited through "domestic slavery". To address this, Davis concludes that the "socialisation of housework – including meal preparation and child care – presupposes an end to the profit-motive's reign over the economy."

Attempts to address these challenges were regularly met with resistance. Attempts to address the exploitation of domestic labor were met with pushback by critics who argued that this type of gendered housework should be considered a social good. In this manner, Marxist feminists argue that unquestioned domestic slavery upholds the structural inequities faced by women in all capitalist economies.

Other Marxist feminist have noted the concept of domestic work for women internationally and the role it plays in buttressing global patriarchy. In Paresh Chattopadhyay's response to Custer's Capital Accumulation and Women's Labor in Asian Economies, Chattopadhyay notes the ways in which Custer analyzes "women's labor in the garments industry in West Bengal and Bangladesh as well as in Bangladesh's agricultural sector, labor management methods of the Japanese industrial bourgeoisie and, finally, the mode of employment of the women laborers in Japanese industry" in demonstrating the ways in which the domestic sphere exhibits similar gender-based exploitation of difference. In both works, the gendered division of labor, specifically within the domestic sphere, is shown to illustrate the methods the capitalist system exploits women globally.

=== Responsibility of reproductive labor ===
Another solution proposed by Marxist feminists is to liberate women from their forced connection to reproductive labor. In her critique of traditional Marxist feminist movements such as the Wages for Housework Campaign, Heidi Hartmann (1981) argues that these efforts "take as their question the relationship of women to the economic system, rather than that of women to men, apparently assuming the latter will be explained in their discussion of the former." Hartmann believes that traditional discourse has ignored the importance of women's oppression as women, and instead focused on women's oppression as members of the capitalist system. Similarly, Gayle Rubin, who has written on a range of subjects including sadomasochism, prostitution, pornography, and lesbian literature, first rose to prominence through her 1975 essay "The Traffic in Women: Notes on the 'Political Economy' of Sex", in which she coins the phrase "sex/gender system" and criticizes Marxism for what she claims is its incomplete analysis of sexism under capitalism.

Through these works, Marxist feminists like Hartmann and Rubin framed the oppression of women as a social phenomenon that occurred when hierarchies based on perceived difference were enforced. This has been challenged within Marxist feminist circles as overcorrecting Marxism's issues with sexism by divorcing the social oppression of women from their economic oppression. In response to Rubin's writings, theorist Brooke Meredith Beloso argued that Marxist feminist critique "must challenge the political economy that has taken and continues to take advantage of anything it can, including feminism, in order to take advantage of millions."

Many Marxist feminists have shifted their focus to the ways in which women are now potentially in worse conditions as a result of gaining access to productive labor. Nancy Folbre proposes that feminist movements begin to focus on women's subordinate status to men both in the reproductive (private) sphere, as well as in the workplace (public sphere). In an interview in 2013, Silvia Federici urges feminist movements to consider the fact that many women are now forced into productive and reproductive labor, resulting in a double day. Federici argues that the emancipation of women cannot occur until they are free from the burden of unwaged labor, which she proposes will involve institutional changes such as closing the wage gap and implementing child care programs in the workplace. Federici's suggestions are echoed in a similar interview with Selma James (2012) and have even been touched on in recent presidential elections.

=== Affective and emotional labor ===
Scholars and sociologists such as Michael Hardt, Antonio Negri, Arlie Russell Hochschild and Shiloh Whitney discuss a new form of labor that transcends the traditional spheres of labor and which does not create product, or is byproductive. Affective labor focuses on the blurred lines between personal life and economic life. Whitney states, "The daily struggle of unemployed persons and the domestic toil of housewives no less than the waged worker are thus part of the production and reproduction of social life, and of the biopolitical growth of capital that valorizes information and subjectivities."

The concept of emotional labor, particularly the emotional labor that is present and required in pink collar jobs, was introduced by Arlie Russell Hochschild in her book The Managed Heart: Commercialization of Human Feeling (1983) in which she considers the affective labor of the profession as flight attendants smile, exchange pleasantries and banter with customers. Marxist feminists identify this as part of the social reproduction of labor, which reinforces gender and racial hierarchies.

== Equal pay for equal labour ==
In 1977 the British feminist sociologist Veronica Beechey published 'Some Notes on Female Wage Labour', which argued that women should be understood as an unrecognised 'reserve arm of labour'. In response, Floya Anthias published 'Woman and the Reserve Army of Labour: A Critique of Veronica Beechy', to query Beechey's arguments, while also recognising that it Beechey's was "the most sophisticated and influential attempt to analyse women's wage labour by using or reconstituting the categories of Marx's Capital". In 1987 Verso published Beechey's collected essays on women's participation in labour as the book Unequal Work.

Women play a crucial role in the labor force through their reproductive responsibilities. They not only give birth to children who will eventually enter the workforce but also contribute to the socialization of these children, preparing them for their future roles as workers and parents. Additionally, women provide support to current workers (often their husbands) through unpaid domestic labor. According to Marxist Feminists, these contributions are significant to the functioning of capitalism, as women's reproductive roles sustain and perpetuate the workforce. Gender divisions in the workforce create a disparity where men are primarily responsible for economic production while women are tasked with reproducing the workforce. In a capitalist society, greater value is placed on the production of goods by men than on the reproductive roles fulfilled by women. Domestic work traditionally carried out by women, such as household chores, home management, and childcare, is often not respected in a capitalist framework, as it lacks exchange value. Hence, this work is undervalued and unpaid, yet women are still expected to complete it.^{[6]}

Within the framework of Marxist Feminism, the unpaid labor of women serves as a tool of exploitation, disproportionately benefiting both men and the capitalist system as a whole. This exploitation takes many forms, such as household chores, caregiving, and emotional labor, creating an invisible yet necessary mechanism for the functioning of society. With this unpaid work, women reproduce the labor force, allowing their male counterparts and the capitalist economy to thrive. The very foundation of capitalism relies on this exploitation; without the continuous unrecognized burden of childcare and domestic responsibilities, many workers would be unable to endure the long shifts demanded by their jobs. As a result, the systemic undervaluing of women's contributions perpetuates economic inequality while ensuring that the capitalist system remains intact and operational.

=== The Family ===
Marxist Feminists see the family as a tool of capitalism, viewing capitalism as the key contributor to the oppression of women rather than men. This branch of feminism analyzes social and political structures to explain the institutional oppression of women rather than the individual level: the actions of men and women.

Olivia Guy-Evans^{[6]} claims the family contributes to the oppression of women in three distinct ways:

- Women reproduce the workforce and socialize them into a social hierarchy
- Women absorb the anger of men who are frustrated by their alienation and exploitation
- Women are a reserve army of cheap labor that can be activated when they are needed and let go when no longer needed

== Intersectionality and Marxist feminism ==
The emergence of intersectionality as a widely popular theory of current feminism saw different responses from Marxist feminists. Traditional Marxist feminists remain critical of its reliance on bourgeois identity politics, arguing that intersectionality limits conceptions of class and power by overemphasizing the individual and not the collective proletariat experience. In this view, differing identities are to be collectively overcome in order to challenge capitalist structures.

Marxist feminists consider intersectionality as a lens to view the interaction of different aspects of identity as a result of structured, systematic oppression. Intersectional Marxist feminism challenges the separation of class and social identity as being an incomplete critique of capitalism, that reproduces bourgeois hierarchy. While class is considered the root cause of systemic oppression in this model, Marxist feminists may use an intersectional lens to understand how class is socially produced on a global scale.

== Accomplishments and activism ==
Marxist feminism's ability to mobilize to promote social change has enabled it to engage in important activism. As activists, Marxist feminists insist "on developing politics that put women's oppression and liberation, class politics, anti-imperialism, antiracism, and issues of gender identity and sexuality together at the heart of the agenda." Marxist feminists challenge capitalism in ways that facilitate new discourse and shed light on the status of women. These women throughout history have used a range of approaches in fighting hegemonic capitalism, which reflect their different views on the optimal method of achieving liberation for women.

A few women who contributed to the development of Marxist feminism as a theory were Chizuko Ueno, Anuradha Ghandy, Claudia Jones, and Angela Davis. Chizuko Ueno is known for being one of the first women to introduce Marxist Feminism in Japan, as one of the primary developers of feminist theories across Japan.

Marxist feminism has also been influential on feminist movements in Latin America. The 2010s feminist movement in Argentina used Marxist feminism to address the relationship between various social and economic factors that contributed to gender violence in the country. Argentinian feminist theorist and activist Verónica Gago wrote in her book, Feminist International: How to Change Everything, about the use of strikes to address femicide, abortion access, and gender-based economic hardship in Argentina through feminist movements such as Ni una menos.

== Notable Marxist feminists ==
- Inessa Armand
- Tithi Bhattacharya
- Angela Davis
- Deng Yingchao
- Ding Ling
- Raya Dunayevskaya
- Silvia Federici
- Clara Fraser
- Nancy Fraser
- Anuradha Ghandy
- Claudia Jones
- Alexandra Kollontai
- Nadezhda Krupskaya
- Anja Meulenbelt
- Evelyn Reed
- Sheila Rowbotham
- Chizuko Ueno
- Lise Vogel
- Xiang Jingyu
- Clara Zetkin

== See also ==
- The Origin of the Family, Private Property, and the State
- Abortion under communism
- Anarcha-feminism
- Feminism in Chinese communism
- Feminist economics
- Feminist theory
- Gender roles in post-communist Central and Eastern Europe
- Intersectionality
- Lucy R. Lippard
- Material feminism
- Neo-Marxism
- Radical feminism
- Revolting Prostitutes
- Socialist feminism
