= Reproductive labor =

Type of domestic labor

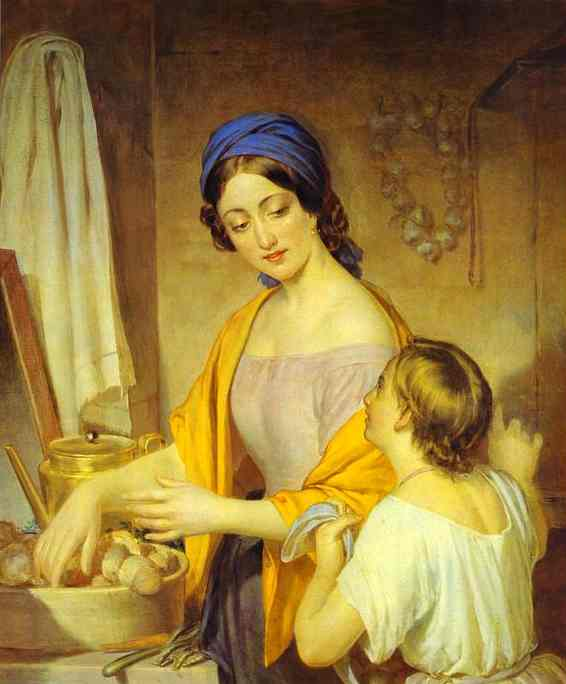
Young Housewife, oil painting on canvas by Alexey Tyranov, currently housed at the Russian Museum in St Petersburg, Russia (1840s)

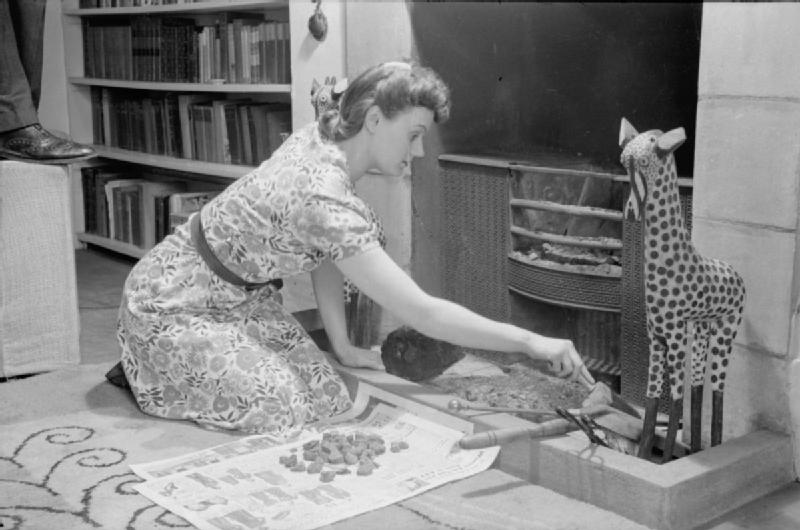
Part of the housework of a London housewife, 1941

Reproductive labor or work is often associated with care giving and domestic housework roles including cleaning, cooking, child care, and the unpaid domestic labor force. The term has taken on a role in feminist philosophy and discourse as a way of calling attention to how women in particular are assigned to the domestic sphere, where the labor is reproductive and thus uncompensated and unrecognized in a capitalist system. These theories have evolved as a parallel of histories focusing on the entrance of women into the labor force in the 1970s, providing an intersectionalist approach that recognizes that women have been a part of the labor force since before their incorporation into mainstream industry if reproductive labor is considered.

Some Marxist anthropologists and economists such as George Caffentzis suggest that reproductive labor creates value in a similar way to the way in which productive labor creates value, by increasing the value of labor power. Economist Shirley P. Burggraf suggests additional value could be realized by replacing government support systems for the elderly (such as the US Social Security System) based on an individual's payroll tax contributions, with parental dividends proportional to the income of one's own children. Such a system could potentially achieve greater efficiency by introducing a return on investment for reproductive labor, thereby incentivizing the care and rearing of children.

== Definitions ==
The division between productive and unproductive labor is stressed by some Marxist feminists including Margaret Benston and Peggy Morton. These theories specify that while productive labor results in goods or services that have monetary value in the capitalist system and are thus compensated by the producers in the form of a paid wage, reproductive labor is associated with the private sphere and involves anything that people have to do for themselves that is not for the purposes of receiving a wage (i.e. cleaning, cooking, having children). These interpretations argue that while both forms of labor are necessary, people have different access to these forms of labor based on certain aspects of their identity.

These theories argue that both public and private institutions exploit the labor of women as an inexpensive method of supporting a work force. For the producers, this means higher profits. For the nuclear family, the power dynamic dictates that domestic work is exclusively to be completed by the woman of the household thus liberating the rest of the members from their own necessary reproductive labor. Marxist feminists argue that the exclusion of women from productive labor leads to male control in both private and public domains.

The concept of reproductive labor as it relates to cleaning, cooking, child care, and the paid domestic labor force has been written about and discussed in writing and history prior to the term being codified. This includes works like Virginia Woolf's essay, "A Room of One's Own".

A distinction has been made between nurturant and non-nurturant reproductive labor. Nurturant reproductive labor jobs include positions in childcare, domestic work, and healthcare. Non-nurturant reproductive labor includes jobs in food preparation and cleaning. With regard to formal employment in the United States in the year 2000, non-white men were overrepresented in this sector relative to their overall workforce participation; this overrepresentation exceeded that of white women, but fell short of that of non-white women. Nurturant reproductive labor jobs are more likely than non nurturant to have women fill the positions for low wages. There is a gendered division in nurturant labor. In the United States, for example, most highly skilled, highly paid healthcare workers are women, but mainly in the shape of Registered Nurses; men in this category are more likely to be physicians or surgeons.

== Wages for housework ==
Focusing on exclusion from productive labor as the most important source of female oppression, some Marxist feminists devoted their activism to fighting for the inclusion of domestic work within the waged capitalist economy. The idea of creating compensated reproductive labor was present in the writings of socialists such as Charlotte Perkins Gilman (1898) who argued that women's oppression stemmed from being forced into the private sphere. Gilman proposed that conditions for women would improve when their work was located, recognized, and valued in the public sphere.

Perhaps the most influential of the efforts to compensate reproductive labor was the International Wages for Housework Campaign, an organization launched in Italy in 1972 by members of the International Feminist Collective. Many of these women, including Selma James, Mariarosa Dalla Costa, Brigitte Galtier, and Silvia Federici published a range of sources to promote their message in academic and public domains. Despite the efforts beginning with a relatively small group of women in Italy, The Wages for Housework Campaign was successful in mobilizing on an international level. A Wages for Housework group was founded in Brooklyn, New York with the help of Federici. As Heidi Hartmann acknowledges (1981), the efforts of these movements, though ultimately unsuccessful, generated important discourse regarding the value of housework and its relation to the economy.

Universal Basic Income has been proposed as a possible solution.

== Sharing reproductive labor ==
Another solution proposed by Marxist feminists is to liberate women from their forced connection to reproductive labor. In her critique of traditional Marxist feminist movements such as the Wages for Housework Campaign, Heidi Hartmann (1981) argues that these efforts "take as their question the relationship of women to the economic system, rather than that of women to men, apparently assuming the latter will be explained in their discussion of the former." Hartmann (1981) believes that traditional discourse has ignored the importance of women's oppression as women, and instead focused on women's oppression as members of the capitalist system. Similarly, Gayle Rubin, who has written on a range of subjects including sadomasochism, prostitution, pornography, and lesbian literature as well as anthropological studies and histories of sexual subcultures, first rose to prominence through her 1975 essay ''"The Traffic in Women: Notes on the 'Political Economy' of Sex"'', in which she coins the phrase "sex/gender system" and criticizes Marxism for what she claims is its incomplete analysis of sexism under capitalism, without dismissing or dismantling Marxist fundamentals in the process.

More recently, many Marxist feminists have shifted their focus to the ways in which women are now potentially in worse conditions after gaining access to productive labor. Nancy Folbre (1994) proposes that feminist movements begin to focus on women's subordinate status to men both in the reproductive (private) sphere, as well as in the workplace (public sphere). In an interview in 2013, Silvia Federici urges feminist movements to consider the fact that many women are now forced into productive and reproductive labor, resulting in a "double day". Federici (2013) argues that the emancipation of women still cannot occur until they are free from their burdens of unwaged labor, which she proposes will involve institutional changes such as closing the wage gap and implementing child care programs in the workplace. Federici's (2013) suggestions are echoed in a similar interview with Selma James (2012) and these issues have been touched on in recent presidential elections.

== International division ==
Evelyn Nakano Glenn provided the insight that reproductive labor was divided based on race and ethnicity, a pattern she called the "racial division of reproductive labor." Industrialization in the nineteenth century morphed society's roles assigned to men and women, with men being seen as the primary breadwinners for their family and women as home maker. However, many middle-class white families in the United States were able to afford to outsource some of the more unpleasant household chores to domestic servants. This racial and ethnic background of the women hired in these roles varied by location. In the Northeast United States, European immigrants, mainly from Germany or Ireland, made up the majority of domestic servants until the beginning of the twentieth century. Throughout time, as the social status of the role declined and the overall working conditions worsened it started to become more racially stratified. The role was mainly taken on by African American women in the South, Mexicans in the Southwest, and Japanese people in northern California and Hawaii. In addition to workers in this position making low wages, they were also often treated as subordinates by their employer, the woman of the house, and the only women that would take these jobs did so because there were no other opportunities available to them. There was an ideology produced that said Black and Latina women were "made" to work and serve for white families as domestic workers. This changed in the late 20th century, where the number of women working as domestic servants first declined due to modernization, development, and an increase in other job opportunities for the women previously taking on this role However, Saskia Sassen-Koob explained that when the economy shifted to service based, it created a demand for immigrant women because low wage jobs were made available in developed countries. Mainly these roles were being taken on largely by immigrants from Mexico, Central America, and the Caribbean. These jobs drew a female workforce to them because of the low wage, so that they are viewed as "women's jobs." Drawing on the work of Glenn and Sassen-Koob's work, Parreñas brought together Glenn's ideas about the racial division of reproductive labor and Sassen-Koob's ideas about feminization and globalization and used them to analyze paid reproductive work.

The term international division of reproductive labor was coined by Rhacel Parreñas in her book, Servants of Globalization: Migrants and Domestic Work, where she discusses Filipino migrant domestic workers. The international division of reproductive labor involves a transfer of labor among three actors in a developed and developing country. It refers to three tiers: wealthier upper-class women who use the migrants to take care of domestic work and the lower class who stay back home to watch the migrant's children. The wealthier women in developed countries have entered the workforce at greater numbers which has led to them having more responsibilities inside and outside of the home. These women are able to hire help and use this privilege of race and class to transfer their reproductive labor responsibilities over to a less privileged woman. Migrant women maintain a hierarchy over their family members and other women who stay back to watch the migrant's children. Parreñas' research explains that the sexual division of labor remains in reproductive labor since women are the ones migrating to work as domestic workers in developed countries.

Parreñas argues that the international division of reproductive labor arose out of globalization and capitalism. Components of globalization including privatization and feminization of labor also contributed to the rise of this division of labor. She explains that globalization has led to reproductive labor to be comodified and demanded internationally. Sending countries are stuck with losing valuable labor while receiving countries take advantage of this labor to grow their economies. Parreñas highlights the role United States colonialism and the International Monetary Fund play in developing countries, such as the Philippines, becoming exporters of migrant workers. This explanation of the root of the concept is crucial because it explains that the financial inequalities the women across the three tiers face are rooted in the economy.

The concept has been expanded by others and applied to locations other than the Philippines where Parreñas conducted her research. In a study done in Guatemala and Mexico, instead of a global transfer of labor, a more local transfer was done between the women who work in the labor force and those other women relatives who take care of the children. A "new international division of reproductive labor" is said to have occurred in Singapore because of outsourcing and taking advantage of a low skilled labor force which has led to the international division of reproductive labor. In order to maintain a strong, growing economy in Southeast Asia, this transfer of reproductive labor is needed. In Singapore, hiring migrant help is a necessity to sustain the economy and the Singaporean woman's status.

== See also ==
- Marxist feminism
- Productive and reproductive labor
- Affective labor
- Anarcha-feminism
- Cost of raising a child
- Demographic economics
- Double burden
- Family economics
- Feminist economics
- Feminist theory
- Material feminism
- Neo-Marxism
- The Origin of the Family, Private Property, and the State
- Radical feminism
- Socialist feminism
- Domestic work
- Feminization of poverty
