= Sarah Walker (activist) =

English political activist

- Education: North London Polytechnic
- Occupations: Activist, spokesperson
- Organization: English Collective of Prostitutes
- Known for: Sex workers' rights advocacy
- Awards: BBC 100 Women (2013)

Sarah Walker is an English political activist and spokesperson for the English Collective of Prostitutes (ECP), a grassroots organisation campaigning for the decriminalisation of sex work. She is also a member of Women of Colour in the Global Women's Strike. In 2013 she was named to the BBC's 100 Women list of inspiring and influential women.

== Early life and education ==
Walker studied English at North London Polytechnic in the early 1980s. While a student, she encountered what she perceived as classism and racism from women involved in student politics, which prompted her to seek alternative activist spaces.

== Activism ==
=== English Collective of Prostitutes ===
Walker first encountered the English Collective of Prostitutes while at North London Polytechnic. She attended the Strangers and Sisters conference in 1982, finding there a movement where she felt at home. Later that year she participated in the 12-day ECP occupation of Holy Cross Church in King's Cross, London, which protested police illegality and racism in the policing of sex workers. The occupation, which ran from 17 to 28 November 1982, also involved activists from Women Against Rape and Black Women for Wages for Housework. Walker later recalled that participants "were crossing divisions".

Walker became a spokeswoman for the ECP, speaking to the media on a range of issues. In 2001 she rebutted police claims to have infiltrated a sex trafficking ring in Soho:

It has nothing to do with illegal immigrants or the rights of women ... The police just want to gentrify the area ... It is to do with money and property values.

In the 2010s Walker linked austerity measures to an increased number of UK students turning to sex work, and other women pushed into sex work by poverty. Speaking to Reuters, she said: "The way that women survive poverty is often through sex work. The government knows that and they don't seem to care frankly." She also commented on media fears that the 2012 Olympic Games would lead to an increase in prostitution.

In 2013 Walker argued that criminalisation traps women in prostitution by giving them criminal records that prevent them from finding alternative employment. She noted: "These laws trap women in prostitution. And police crackdowns also have a habit of forcing girls into other areas which they are less familiar with. It makes it so much more dangerous."

In November 2015, the ECP organised a symposium titled "Decriminalisation of Prostitution: The Evidence" at the House of Commons, hosted by John McDonnell, which brought together sex workers from ten countries, academics, and representatives from organisations such as Women Against Rape. The symposium's findings were lodged in the House of Commons Library for parliamentarians to reference. In December 2017, Walker appeared as a panellist at Tate Modern for a screening of the documentary Generation Revolution (2016), discussing the relationship between activism, labour and production.

=== Other activism ===
In 2015 Walker supported Jeremy Corbyn and John McDonnell in their leadership of the Labour Party, co-authoring the pamphlet Why People Of Colour Should Support the new Corbyn/McDonnell Movement.
