= Barbara Reskin =

American sociologist

Barbara Reskin (born 1940) is a professor of sociology. As the S. Frank Miyamoto Professor of Sociology at the University of Washington, Reskin studies labor market stratification, examining job queues, nonstandard work, sex segregation, and affirmative action policies in employment and university admissions, mechanisms of work-place discrimination, and the role of credit markets in income poverty and inequality.

Reskin has spent many years teaching, holding previous faculty positions at University of California-Davis, Indiana University, University of Michigan, University of Illinois at Urbana-Champaign, Harvard, and Ohio State University. Reskin has written six books and many articles on gender and racial inequality in the workplace.

== Biography ==
Reskin was born in Saint Paul, Minnesota, and grew up in Renton, Washington. After a brief stint at Reed College, Reskin moved to Cleveland, Ohio, where she was involved in the Congress on Racial Equality. Reskin returned to the Pacific Northwest and received her bachelor's degree, in 1968, and Ph.D., in 1973, from the University of Washington.

=== Honors ===
Reskin served on the Board of Overseers of the General Social Survey and on several National Academy of Sciences/National Research Council committees. A past fellow at the Center for Advanced Study in the Behavioral Sciences, Reskin is a fellow of the American Association of Arts and Sciences and a member of the U.S. National Academy of Sciences. She served as the 93rd President of the American Sociological Association in 2002 and was awarded a Distinguished Scholar Award of the ASA Section on Sex and Gender. Other honors include the Cheryl Miller-Sociologists for Women in Society Lecturership and the SWS Mentorship Award.

== Queuing theory ==
Barbara Reskin is known for her expansion and use of queuing theory to explain the persistence sex segregation in the workplace despite the movement of many women into new occupational fields. While occupational segregation has declined since 1970, most workers remain in sex-segregated jobs. Through the queuing approach we are able to see how and why sex segregation remains a prominent feature of the workplace. A variety of social and economic forces enable segregation as well as to diminish it.

=== Queuing ===
A queuing perspective suggests that labor markets consist of labor queues and job queues. Labor queues consist of all possible workers in a "queue" to fill a particular job, and the employer determines the order of the workers in this queue. Similarly, job queues consist of all possible jobs available to a worker, with workers ranking the available jobs. Employers hire workers from as high in the labor queue as possible and the workers will accept the best possible job. By doing this the most wanted jobs go to the most favored workers, while the less preferred jobs go to the less wanted workers. This procedure then leaves the deprived workers with no job or occupying jobs that others have rejected.

Three factors influence job and labor queues: the ordering of the elements, whether or not these elements overlap, and lastly their shape. The order of the elements pertains to the order that workers rank preferred jobs and employers rank potential workers. The overlap of the elements refers to the strength of the ranker's choices for one element over another. The shape is determined by the absolute and relative numbers of elements in a queue. An example would be a situation in which the preferred workers group was the same size as the preferred job group, in which the preferred group will dominate the occupation of the good jobs.

=== Occupational feminization ===
There are four notable reasons that there has been a change in occupations' sex composition.

The first is job deterioration which is attributed to the changing of the ordering of job queues. Most of the jobs Reskin studied feminized after the rewards changed, therefore making them less appealing than other possibilities.

The second factor is job growth which shows that there was a change in the shape of the job queues. There was a time when you wouldn't need to hire women because you had enough men to do the job. But with an increasing job market, there was more of a spread of who wanted what jobs.

The third factor was the emergence of a sex-specific demand for women which reflected the changes in the ordering of labor queues. After anti-discrimination laws were passed, employers were concerned about the costs—both monetarily and reputation-based—that they would run into by hiring solely men.

Connected to the third factor is the fourth which is the declining preference for men. This is due to the changes in employers’ preferences. As stated before, the public would no longer tolerate discrimination towards women. Actions such as the civil rights movement and the feminist movement reinforced this concept.

=== Understanding occupational composition ===
First, we see that queuing highlights the group nature of sex segregation that occurs due to rankings that are socially structured by groups in conflict. It also takes the effects of noneconomic factors into account—the rankings of both employers on potential employees and prospective employees’ rankings on the jobs available. Lastly, queuing presumes that a person will rank occupations similarly based on their sex, which ultimately foreshadows women's entry into traditionally male occupations based on the rewards they offer.

== Publications ==
=== Books ===
- Reskin, Barbara; Hartmann, Heidi I. (1986). Women's work, men's work sex segregation on the job. Washington, D.C.: National Academy Press. ISBN 978-0-309-03429-6.
- Reskin, Barbara (1990). Job queues, gender queues: explaining women's inroads into male occupations. Philadelphia: Temple University Press. ISBN 978-0-87722-744-1.
- Reskin, Barbara (1998). The realities of affirmative action in employment. Washington, DC: American Sociological Association. ISBN 978-0-912764-36-8.
- Reskin, Barbara; Padavic, Irene (2002). Women and men at work. Thousand Oaks: Pine Forge Press. ISBN 978-0-7619-8710-9.

=== Book chapters ===
- Reskin, Barbara F. (1994), "Labor market as queues: a structural approach to changing occupational sex composition", in Grusky, David B. (ed.), Social stratification: class, race, and gender in sociological perspective, Boulder, Colorado: Westview Press, pp. 718–733, ISBN 978-0-8133-1065-7.

=== Recent peer-reviewed articles ===
- Reskin, Barbara F.; Merritt, Deborah Jones; Hargens, Lowell L. (2001). "Raising the bar: a social science critique of recent increases to passing scores on the bar exam". University of Cincinnati Law Review. 69 (2). University of Cincinnati College of Law: 929–968. SSRN 249794.
- Reskin, Barbara F. (February 2003). "Including mechanisms in our models of ascriptive inequality: 2002 Presidential Address". American Sociological Review. 68 (1). SAGE: 1–21. doi:10.2307/3088900. JSTOR 3088900.
- Reskin, Barbara; Harper, Shannon (August 2005). "Affirmative action at school and on the job". Annual Review of Sociology. 31. Annual Reviews: 357–379. doi:10.1146/annurev.soc.31.041304.122155. JSTOR 29737724.
- Reskin, Barbara F.; Bielby, Denise B. (Winter 2005). "A sociological perspective on gender and career outcomes". Journal of Economic Perspectives. 19 (1). American Economic Association: 71–86. doi:10.1257/0895330053148010. JSTOR 4134993.
