= Capitalist Patriarchy and the Case for Socialist Feminism =

- Cover of the first edition
- Editor: Zillah R. Eisenstein
- Language: English
- Subject: Socialist feminism
- Publisher: Monthly Review Press
- Publication date: 1978
- Media type: Print (hardcover and paperback)

Capitalist Patriarchy and the Case for Socialist Feminism is a 1978 anthology about socialist feminism edited by Zillah R. Eisenstein.

The sociologist Rhonda F. Levine cites the work as a "superb discussion of the socialist-feminist position". Levine goes on to describe the book as "one of the earliest statements of how a Marxist class analysis can combine with a feminist analysis of patriarchy to produce a theory of how gender and class intersect as systems of inequality".

"Eisenstein defines the term 'capitalist patriarchy' as descriptive of the 'mutually reinforcing dialectical relationship between capitalist class structure and hierarchical sexual structuring."

She believes that "the recognition of women as a sexual class lays the subversive quality of feminism for liberalism because liberalism is premised upon women's exclusion from public life on this very class basis. The demand for real equality of women with men, if taken to its logical conclusion, would dislodge the patriarchal structure necessary to a liberal society."
