= Louise Toupin =

Canadian political scientist

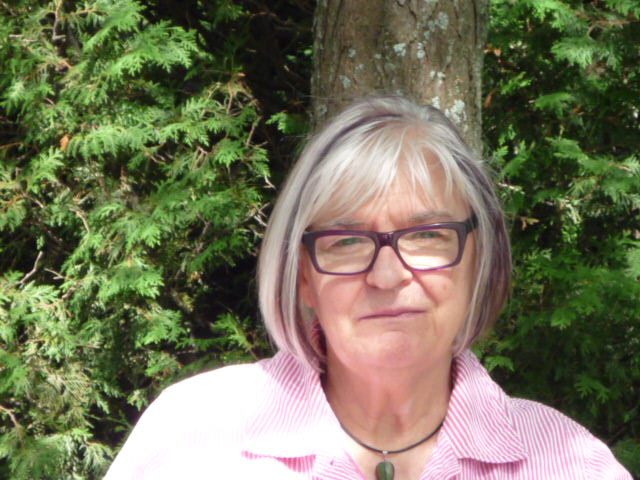
- Louise Toupin in 2016
- Education: Université de Montréal; Université du Québec à Montréal
- Scientific career
- Fields: Political science
- Workplaces: Université du Québec à Montréal

Louise Toupin is a Canadian political scientist and specialist in feminist studies. She was a founding member of the Women's Liberation Front of Quebec (fr) and Éditions du remue-ménage (fr), which were important sites of feminist activism in the late 1960s and early 1970s in Montreal. She then earned a PhD from the Université du Québec à Montréal, later becoming a lecturer at that same institution. Her research focused on collections and analyses of feminist theory from the recent history of Québec.

== Activism and education ==
Toupin was born in Champlain, Quebec, Canada in 1946. From 1969 until 1971, she was a member of the Women's Liberation Front of Quebec, which was the first neo-feminist group in Montreal. Members of Toupin's activist group in the Women's Liberation Front activists were briefly imprisoned for protests they staged during the trial process of Lise Balcer, a 21-year-old woman who was linked to the Front de libération du Québec terrorist Paul Rose during the events surrounding the October Crisis. In 1976 she co-founded the Éditions du remue-ménage, a feminist publishing house in Montreal. Since 2000, she has been engaged in advancing the rights of sex workers, and their societal inclusion. In 2011, she co-founded the Alliance féministe solidaire for the rights of sex workers.

Toupin earned her master's degree at the Université de Montréal in 1972. She then earned a PhD at the Université du Québec à Montréal in 1994, with a thesis called Mères ou citoyennes? Une critique du discours historique nord-américain (1960-1990) sur le mouvement féministe (1850-1960) (Mothers or citizens? A critique of the historical North-American discourse from 1960-1990 on the feminist movement from 1850-1960). She then worked as a postdoctoral researcher at the European University Institute in Florence, Italy.

== Academic career ==
Toupin spent much of her career as a lecturer at the Université du Québec à Montréal. Toupin published three anthologies grouping together texts by feminist activists. The two volumes of Québécoises deboutte! (Quebec women standing up!), which were co-authored with Véronique O'Leary, contain writings from two major Second-wave feminist groups in Québec: the Front de libération des femmes du Québec and the Women's Centre. Similarly, La Pensée féministe au Québec. Anthologie 1900-1985 (Anthology of feminist thought in Québec, 1900-1985), which Toupin co-authored with Micheline Dumont, is a collection of 180 texts from feminist activists. Finally, the anthology Luttes XXX. Inspirations du mouvement international des travailleuses du sexe (XXX struggles: Inspirations from the international sex worker movement), co-authored with Maria-Nengeh Mensah (fr) and Claire Thiboutot (fr), contains 80 contributions from the sex work activist movement. Toupin also wrote the summary document Les courants de pensée féministe (Currents of feminist thought) in 1998.

Toupin has also done substantial work on the concept of recognizing the invisible work which is typically conducted by women, a concept which she elaborated in her essay Le Salaire au travail ménager. Chronique d’une lutte féministe internationale (1972-1977) (Wages for housework: A chronicle of an international feminist struggle from 1972-1977). This essay, published in 2014, traces the early history of the Wages for housework campaign, which was an international movement to make housework a paid occupation spearheaded by the International Feminist Collective.

Toupin also co-edited, with the historian Camille Robert (fr), a work composed of texts that take stock of the invisibility of some work which is traditionally done by women, and how this work is manifested throughout different communities in Quebec.

Toupin's work has been cited, or translated pieces written by her have been published, in English-language press outlets like The New York Times and rabble.ca. Toupin's work has also been extensively covered in French-language outlets including La Presse, Le Devoir, the Huffington Post, Elle, and Radio-Canada.
