= Leopoldina Fortunati =

Italian feminist, theorist, and author

- Born: 18 July 1949 (age 76); Province of Venice, Italy

Leopoldina Fortunati (born 18 July 1949) is an Italian feminist, theorist, and author. Her influences include Mariarosa Dalla Costa, Antonio Negri, and Karl Marx.

== Work ==
She is the author of The Arcane of Reproduction: Housework, Prostitution, Labor and Capital (L'arcano della riproduzione: Casalinghe, prostitute, operai e capitale, 1981), a feminist critique of Marx. She also wrote I mostri nell’immaginario (FrancoAngeli, 1995).

She is the editor of Gli Italiani al telefono (FrancoAngeli, 1995) and Telecomunicando in Europa (FrancoAngeli, 1998), as well as Mediating the Human Body: Technology, Communication and Fashion with James E. Katz and Raimonda Riccini (Routledge, 2003).

She has published articles in journals such as The Information Society, Information, Communication & Society, Widersprüche, Personal and Ubiquitous Computing, International Communication Gazette, and Problemi dell'informazione. Her works have been published in Chinese, English, French, German, Italian, Japanese, Korean, Russian, and Spanish.

Fortunati teaches sociology at the University of Udine, Italy. She has conducted extensive research in the field of gender studies, cultural processes, and communication and information technologies.

She is the founding volume editor for the Human-Machine Communication journal, an associate editor of the journal The Information Society, a member of the editorial board of the Journal of Communication, a past member of the international editorial board of the journal New Media & Society, and a referee for the journals Information, Communication & Society and Journal for the Theory of Social Behaviour.

She represented Italy in the COST Association's Technical Committee on Social Sciences and Humanities and in the COST Action A20 "The Impact of Internet on the Mass Media in Europe". She was part of the European research project SIGIS (Strategies of Inclusion: Gender and the Information Society) and of COST248 "The Future European Telecommunications User" and was the vice-chairperson of COST269 "User Aspects of ICTs". She is the co-chair of the Society for the Social Study of Mobile Communication (SSSMC) which intends to facilitate the international advancement of cross-disciplinary mobile communication studies.

== Bibliography ==
- The Arcane of Reproduction: Housework, Prostitution, Labor and Capital (New York: Autonomedia, 1996).
- "Learning to Struggle: My Story Between Workerism and Feminism", Viewpoint Magazine 3 (September 2013).
