= Global Women's Strike =

International feminist campaign

The Global Women's Strike is a movement that seeks to value all women's work and all women's lives around the world. Many countries (including Guyana, Haiti, the United States, the United Kingdom, India, Italy, Peru, Luxembourg and Ireland) actively participate in this campaign in an effort to grant women justice for their unacknowledged contribution in the labor force.

== Background ==
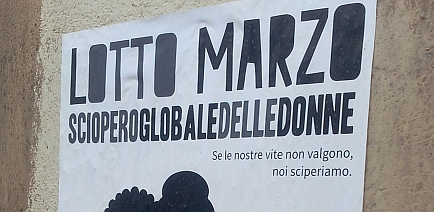
Poster of a demonstration connected to the 8 March 2017 strike in Turin (Italy).

Women and girls perform nearly two-thirds of the work in most given households. This work includes physical labor such as washing dishes, doing laundry, vacuuming, etc. but also emotional labor such as sending out birthday cards, organizing family vacations, preparing for holidays, etc. Much of this work in the household, while at times is referred to as a "second shift," remains unpaid. It is also not included in a country's gross national product or gross domestic product, although women's unpaid labor is estimated at nearly $11 trillion. Many of the women engaged in this campaign argue that a large portion of this problem can be traced back to the military-industrial complex. More than $1 trillion a year is spent on the military worldwide, owing a large portion of this spending to the United States. If 10% of this money was circulated back into the community, it could be used to provide essentials for living: water, basic health care, sanitation, nutrition programs, literacy programs, minimum wage. The Global Women's Strike, which is a result of the International Wages for Housework Campaign started by Selma James in 1972, seeks the recognition and payment for all caring work and the return of military spending to the community through a policy of "Invest in Caring, Not Killing".

== Goals ==
The goals of the global campaign are:

- the payment of caring work of any kind, in money or in terms of other resources;
- obtaining more investments in welfare, possibly cutting military expenses;
- wages equity for women and men all around the global market;
- money, benefits and breaks for maternity and breastfeeding;
- Third World debt abolition;
- better accessibility to clean water, decent housing, healthcare, public transports and literacy.
- less working hours thanks to the use of technology;
- protection against violence and persecution of any kind and, where necessary, asylum;
- freedom of travel and movement.

== Examples around the World ==
- Luxembourg Women's strike Fraestreik
