= Zillah Eisenstein =

American political theorist

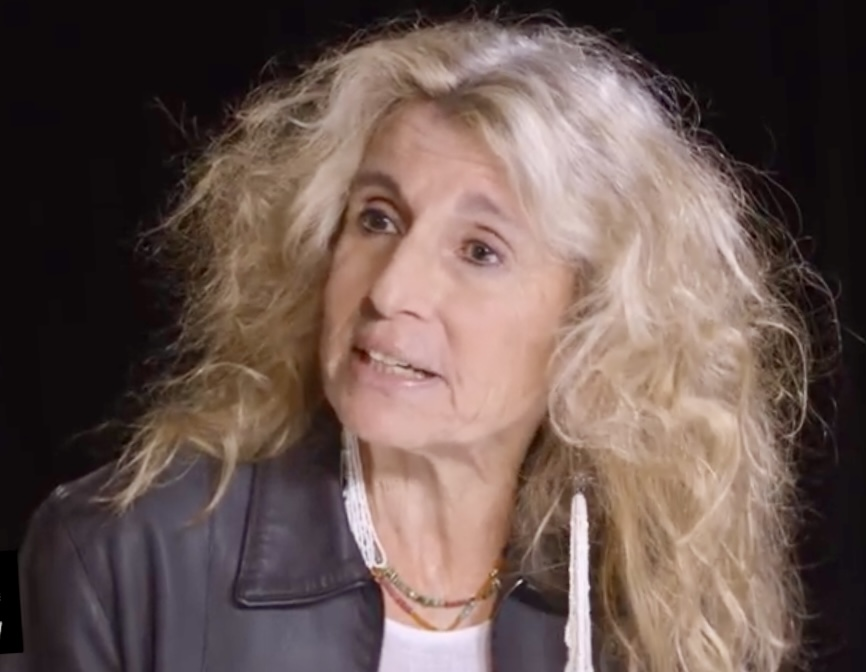
- Eisenstein in 2016
- Years active: 1972-present
- Title: Emerita Professor of Politics

Academic background
- Education: Ohio University; University of Massachusetts

Zillah R. Eisenstein is an American political theorist and gender studies scholar and Emerita Professor of the Department of Politics at Ithaca College, Ithaca, New York. Specializing in political and feminist theory; class, sex, and race politics; and construction of gender, Eisenstein is the author of twelve books and editor of the 1978 collection Capitalist Patriarchy and the Case for Socialist Feminism, which published the Combahee River Collective statement.

Eisenstein received her B.A. in Political Science from Ohio University in 1968 and her M.A. and Ph.D. (1972) from the University of Massachusetts. She began teaching at Ithaca College in 1973 and was tenured in 1978. Her papers (1966 to 2011) are held in the Feminist Theory Archives of Brown University's Pembroke Center in Providence, Rhode Island.

Eisenstein writes an opinion column for Al Jazeera.

In March 2022 she was amongst 151 international feminists signing Feminist Resistance Against War: A Manifesto, in solidarity with the Russian Feminist Anti-War Resistance. (Note: This manifesto was criticized by both Ukrainian feminists and members of the Feminist Anti-War Resistance themselves.)

== Works ==
- 1978, ed., Capitalist Patriarchy and the Case for Socialist Feminism (Monthly Review Press)
- 1981, The Radical Future of Liberal Feminism (Longman)
- 1984, Feminism and Sexual Equality: Crisis in Liberal America (Monthly Review Press)
- 1988, The Female Body and the Law (University of California Press)
- 1994, The Color of Gender: Reimagining Democracy (University of California Press)
- 1996, Hatreds: Racialized and Sexualized Conflicts in the 21st Century (Routledge)
- 1996, Global Obscenities: Patriarchy, Capitalism and the Lure of Cyberfantasy (NYU Press)
- 2001, Manmade Breast Cancers (Cornell University Press)
- 2007, Sexual Decoys, Gender, Race and War in Imperial Democracy (Zed Press, London; Palgrave, U.S.)
- 2007, Against Empire: Feminisms, Race and the West (Zed Press, London; Palgrave, U.S.)
- 2009, The Audacity of Races and Genders, A Personal and Global Story of the Obama Campaign (Zed Press, London; Palgrave, U.S.)
- 2019, Abolitionist Socialist Feminism, Radicalizing the Next Revolution (Monthly Review Press)
