= Mariarosa Dalla Costa =

Italian autonomist feminist author (born 1943)

- Born: 1943 (age 81–82); Treviso, Italy
- Known for: Co-founding the International Feminist Collective
- Notable work: The Power of Women and the Subversion of the Community (with Selma James)

Mariarosa Dalla Costa (born 1943) is an Italian autonomist feminist and co-author of the classic The Power of Women and the Subversion of the Community, with Selma James. This text launched the "domestic labour debate" by redefining housework as reproductive labour necessary to the functioning of capital, rendered invisible by its removal from the wage relation.

A member of Lotta Femminista, Dalla Costa developed this analysis as an immanent critique of Italian workerism.

She was a co-founder of the International Feminist Collective, an organisation formed in Padua in 1972 to promote political debate and action around the issue of housework that gave rise to the International Wages for Housework Campaign.

== Works ==
- The Power of Women & the Subversion of the Community (with Selma James); Bristol: Falling Wall Press, 1972
- Women, Development, and Labor of Reproduction: Struggles and Movements (edited with Giovanna F. Dalla Costa); Africa World Press, 1999
- Gynocide: Hysterectomy, Capitalist Patriarchy and the Medical Abuse of Women (edited); Brooklyn: Autonomedia, 2007
- Family, Welfare, and the State: Between Progressivism and the New Deal (edited); Common Notions, 2015

== See also ==
- Wages for housework
- Leopoldina Fortunati
- Maria Mies
- Silvia Federici
