= English Collective of Prostitutes =

British sex workers campaigning group

- Formation: 1975
- Founded at: London, England
- Headquarters: London, England
- Website: Official website

The English Collective of Prostitutes (ECP) is a campaigning group which supports the decriminalisation of prostitution, sex workers' right to recognition and safety, and the provision of financial alternatives to prostitution so that no one is forced into prostitution by poverty. The group works against the social stigma that is associated with prostitution, and the poverty that is sometimes its cause. It provides information, help, and support to individual prostitute women and others who are concerned with sex workers' rights, civil, legal, and economic rights. The organisation was founded in 1975, and its first spokeswoman was Selma James.

== Origins ==
The ECP was formed as part of the highly politicised prostitutes' rights movement that emerged in Europe in the mid-1970s. The 1975 prostitutes' strike in France and the subsequent formation of the French Prostitute Collective inspired the formation of a similar organisation in England.

== Associations ==
The ECP and the US PROStitutes Collective (US PROS) are part of the International Prostitutes Collective, which has a network of sex workers in many countries of the world. The ECP is said to work closely with the New Zealand Prostitutes' Collective who spearheaded legislation in New Zealand in 2003 to decriminalise prostitution. A 2010 review by the New Zealand Government found that over a seven-year period there had been no increase in the number of sex workers in Christchurch.

In the aftermath of the Ipswich serial murders of five young women in December 2006, the ECP initiated the Safety First Coalition to decriminalise sex work, and prioritise safety. Members include the Royal College of Nursing, the National Association of Probation Officers, bereaved families, some anti-poverty campaigners, church people, residents of red-light areas, medical and legal professionals, prison reformers, sex workers, anti-rape organisations, drug rehabilitation projects.

== Campaigns and positions ==
=== Policing and Crime Act ===
The English Collective of Prostitutes campaigned against the Policing and Crime Act 2009, which originally included proposals to criminalise anyone involved in the sex industry, whether or not there was force or coercion; target safer premises; seize and retain money and assets, even without a conviction; increase arrests against street workers; arrest men on "suspicion"; imprison sex workers who breach a compulsory rehabilitation order. The ECP argued that these measures would force prostitution underground, exposing sex workers to greater danger and preventing them coming forward to report violence and access health and other services.

=== Trafficking ===
The ECP argues that discredited academic work has falsely labelled most sex workers as victims of "trafficking". Its website provides critiques of such work.

=== Decriminalisation ===
In 2015, the ECP organised a symposium in the House of Commons, presenting evidence to parliament in support of the decriminalisation of sex work.

=== Universal Credit ===
In 2019 Laura Watson from the ECP gave evidence to the Work and Pensions Select Committee which was examining the link between sex work and poverty caused by the introduction of Universal Credit. She said that payment delays had led to "increased destitution and homelessness" and pushed some women into "survival sex".

=== COVID-19 pandemic ===
In the spring of 2020, during the initial stages of the COVID-19 pandemic, Niki Adams of the ECP warned that some sex workers were continuing to see clients during England's first national lockdown as a result of financial need, potentially exposing themselves and others to COVID-19, and asked for emergency cash payments for sex workers in need. In the autumn of that year the ECP renewed its request for emergency payments as a result of the country's second national lockdown. In January 2021, at the beginning of the country's third national lockdown, the ECP reported that increasing numbers of women were turning to sex work for the first time as a result of poverty.

=== Local issues ===
The ECP has been involved in local campaigns aimed at making life safer for prostitutes following incidents in certain areas, for example, the Ipswich murders of 2006 in which all the victims were prostitutes. It also objects to the actions of Reading Borough Council and the Thames Valley Police, which have been targeting prostitutes working in the Oxford Road area of Reading, Berkshire, for several years.

== See also ==
- COYOTE
- Prostitution in the United Kingdom
- Revolting Prostitutes
- Sex/Work Strike
- Sex-positive movement
