= Mary Inman =

American newspaper editor

Ida Mary Inman
- Born: June 11, 1894; Kentucky, U.S.
- Died: 1985 (aged 90–91)
- Occupations: Political activist, writer
- Notable work: In Woman's Defense
- Spouse: J. Frank Ryan

Ida Mary Inman (1894–1985), known as Mary Inman, was an American political activist and writer. Inman is best known for her 1940 book, In Woman's Defense, which was a pioneering effort to legitimize the domestic labor associated with homemaking as a worthy and respectable field of human endeavor.

== Biography ==
=== Early years ===
Ida Mary Inman, known to her friends as "Mary," was born June 11, 1894, in the state of Kentucky. She was the youngest of nine children. In 1900 the family moved to the Indian Territory, part of today's Oklahoma, and Mary Inman remained there for the next 17 years.

Inman's mother died in 1905 and her older sister followed two years later, forcing Mary to begin assuming primary homemaking tasks for the large family at an early age.

During the first decade of the 20th century, Oklahoma was a hotbed of activity for the Socialist Party of America and in 1910, when she was just 16, Inman joined that organization. She met her future husband, J. Frank Ryan, an organizer for the Oil Workers' Union of the Industrial Workers of the World (IWW) not long after. A long courtship ensued before the pair were finally married in July 1917. The honeymoon proved short-lived, however, as anti-Wobbly sentiment grew more bitter and violent during the wartime years, exploding after the suppression of the August 1917 Green Corn Rebellion, which was blamed on the IWW in the press. In November 1917 the couple found themselves forced to flee Tulsa to avoid anti-IWW vigilantes.

Inman and her husband moved to Kansas City, Missouri, where, in an attempt to keep government agents and anti-IWW vigilantes at bay, they assumed Mary's surname rather than his. This temporary expedient was later formalized by both Mary and Frank with a legal change of name.

=== In Woman's Defense ===
Although there is no exact date or reason for their relocation, at some point Mary and Frank Inman moved to Southern California, where they became active in the Communist Party USA (CPUSA). Frank went to work for the Pacific Telephone and Telegraph Company and Mary rented a small office in Los Angeles, where she set to work writing a book on women's labor, emphasizing women's work in the home as a worthy pursuit. The 600 page manuscript was completed in 1936 but was initially rejected by the CPUSA as unsatisfactory for the party press. Instead, Inman began working with former Wobbly turned Communist Harrison George, then the editor of the party's West Coast newspaper, People's World, based in San Francisco. George began publishing Inman's manuscript in weekly installments in the paper.

In 1940 these published articles were collected in hard covers as a book entitled In Woman's Defense. Several printings were needed to satisfy demand for the work.

In Woman's Defense drew upon Inman's experience as a young girl keeping house for her father and siblings. Inman expanded upon the observation of CPUSA women's leader Margaret Cowl that "all women are in an unequal position with men in all countries," making the novel argument that in addition to the exploitation they suffered on the basis of their class position, women as a whole were additionally members of a super-exploited social group based upon their gender.

While Inman's work was at first warmly received by several top Communist women leaders, including Elizabeth Gurley Flynn and Ella Reeve Bloor, the mood changed in 1941 when the CPUSA leadership began an official attack on Inman's work for purported ideological deviation. A series of articles written against Inman's ideas appeared in the party's literary monthly, The New Masses, and the polemic was extended with the publication of a pamphlet by A. Landy, Marxism and the Woman Question.

Despite the hostility on the part of the Communist Party, Inman moved forward with the publication of another book in 1942, Woman Power, a work which incorporated the remainder of her 1936 manuscript.

=== Subsequent political career ===
From 1943 to 1946, Inman published an edited a newspaper called Facts for Women, into which she incorporated much of her journalistic energy. Among Inman's unrealized ideas was a desire to form an organization of housewives called the Union of Labor-Power Production Workers (housewives).

Inman's alienation from the Communist Party reached its peak in 1949 when she published a bitter mimeographed polemic against the CPUSA's policy towards women, entitled Thirteen Years of CPUSA Misleadership on the Woman Question.

Inman's final book was published in 1964, entitled The Two Forms of Production Under Capitalism. Inman remained dedicated to the so-called "Woman Question," engaging CPUSA General Secretary Gus Hall with a 66-page letter in 1972 and writing a lengthy article for the party's theoretical magazine, Political Affairs, in 1973.

=== Death and legacy ===
Mary Inman's papers are housed in five archival boxes, one folder, and one folio volume at the Arthur and Elizabeth Schlesinger Library on the History of Women in America at Harvard University in Cambridge, Massachusetts. Use of this material is open to researchers.

== Works ==
- "The Role of the Housewife in Social Production (1940)", Viewpoint Magazine 5 (October 2015).
- In Woman's Defense. Los Angeles: Committee to Organize the Advancement of Women, 1940.
- Woman Power. Los Angeles: Committee to Organize the Advancement of Women, 1942.
- Thirteen Years of CPUSA Misleadership on the Woman Question: Documented. Los Angeles: Mary Inman, 1949.
- The Two Forms of Production under Capitalism. Long Beach, CA: n.p., 1964.
