= Selma James =

American writer, feminist, and social activist (born 1930)

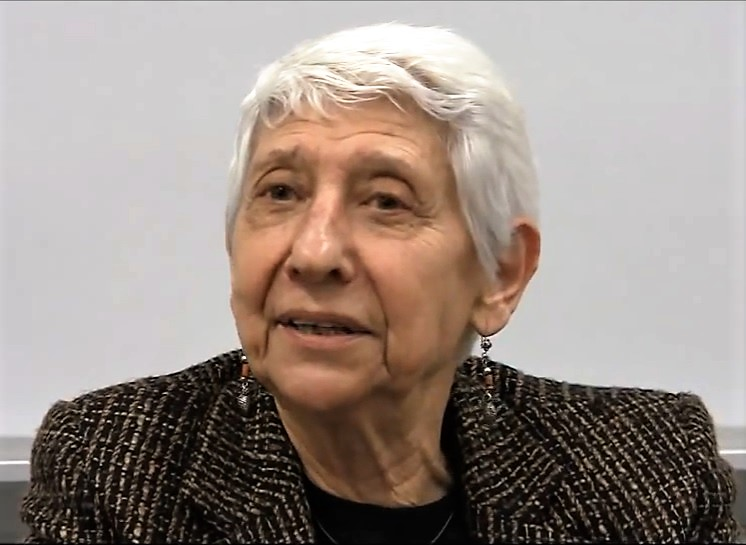
- James in 2012
- Born: Selma Deitch; August 15, 1930 (age 96); New York City, US
- Other name: Selma Weinstein
- Occupations: Writer, activist
- Years active: 1952–present
- Known for: Co-founder of International Wages for Housework Campaign
- Notable work: The Power of Women and the Subversion of the Community (1972); Sex, Race and Class (1974)
- Spouse: C. L. R. James (m. 1956; div. 1980)
- Children: 1 son
- Website: globalwomenstrike.net

Selma James (born Selma Deitch; formerly Weinstein; August 15, 1930) is an American writer, feminist, and social activist who is co-author of the women's movement book The Power of Women and the Subversion of the Community (with Mariarosa Dalla Costa), co-founder of the International Wages for Housework Campaign, and coordinator of the Global Women's Strike.

== Early life and activism ==
Deitch was born in the Brownsville neighborhood of Brooklyn, New York, in 1930. She was raised in a Jewish household and her father was a truck driver while her mother had been a factory worker prior to having children. As a young woman, Deitch worked in factories, and then as a full-time housewife and mother to her son, Sam, with whose father, a fellow factory worker, she was in a short-lived marriage. At the age of 15, she had joined the Johnson–Forest Tendency, one of whose three leaders was C. L. R. James, and she began to attend his classes on slavery and the American civil war.

In 1952, she wrote the book A Woman's Place, first published as a column in Correspondence, a working-class newspaper. She was a regular columnist and edited the women's page. In 1955, she went to England to marry C. L. R. James, who had been deported from the United States during the McCarthy period. They were together for 25 years, and were close political colleagues.

From 1958 to 1962, she lived in Trinidad and Tobago, where, with her husband, she was active in the movement for West Indian independence and federation. Returning to Britain after independence, she became the first organising secretary of the Campaign Against Racial Discrimination in 1965, and a founding member of the Black Regional Action Movement and editor of its journal in 1969.

== Wages for Housework ==
In January 1971, James made a BBC Radio broadcast in the series People for Tomorrow—using her own experience of working in low-paid jobs and being a mother and housewife, as well as interviews with full-time housewives, and other women working outside the home while still doing most of the household chores—to explore the exploitation of women in society in general. In 1972, the publication The Power of Women and the Subversion of the Community (co-authored with Mariarosa Dalla Costa) launched the "domestic labour debate" by spelling out how housework and other care work women do outside of the market produces the whole working class, and thus how the market economy is built on women's unwaged work.

That same year, James founded the International Wages for Housework Campaign (IWFHC), which demands money from the state for unwaged work in the home and in the community. A public debate followed about whether caring full-time was work and whether it should be compensated with a wage. James's 1972 paper Women, the Unions and Work was presented at the National Conference of Women on March 25–26, 1972. In a 2002 interview with BBC News 24 she stated that housework counted for "basic work in society," that women are entitled to a wage, and that "we want the acknowledgement from society that the work we are doing is fundamental and important."

James was the first spokesperson of the English Collective of Prostitutes, which campaigns for decriminalisation as well as viable economic alternatives to prostitution. The 1983 publication of James's Marx and Feminism broke with established Marxist theory by providing a reading of Marx's Capital from the point of view of women and of unwaged work. Beginning in 1985, she helped found the International Women Count Network, which succeeded in winning the UN decision directing governments to measure and value unwaged work in national statistics.

== Later activity ==
James lectures in the United Kingdom, the United States, and other countries on a wide range of topics.

=== Feminist activism ===
Since 2000, James has been international coordinator of the Global Women's Strike, a grassroots network of women. The strike demands that society "Invest in Caring Not Killing" and that military budgets be returned to the community, starting with women. She has been working with the Venezuelan Revolution since 2002. She is a founder of the Crossroads Women's Centre, begun under the WFH auspices in 1975 in a red-light district near London's Euston railway station and now located in Kentish Town.

=== Socialist activism ===
In April 2008, James visited Edinburgh (along with Ralph and Noreen Ibbott, members of the Britain Tanzania Society in the 1960s) on the anniversary of Tanzania Muungano Day, which falls on April 26. James gave a talk in a session hosted by the Tanzania Edinburgh Community Association (TzECA) on Julius Nyerere's ujamaa in the 1960s in Tanzania. The session took place at Waverley Care Solas.

In July 2015, James endorsed Jeremy Corbyn's campaign in the Labour Party leadership election.

=== Anti-Zionist activism ===
James is a founder member of the International Jewish Anti-Zionist Network and, in May 2008, signed the Letter of British Jews published in The Guardian explaining why they would not celebrate the 60th anniversary of Israel's founding. In August 2015, she was a signatory to a letter criticising The Jewish Chronicle's reporting of Jeremy Corbyn's association with alleged antisemites.

== Notable works ==
- A Woman's Place (1952)
- The Power of Women & the Subversion of the Community (with Mariarosa Dalla Costa; Bristol: Falling Wall Press, 1972)
- Women, the Unions and Work, or What Is Not To Be Done (Notting Hill Women's Liberation Workshop, 1972)
- Sex, Race & Class (Race Today, 1974)
- The Rapist Who Pays the Rent (with Ruth Hall and Judit Kertesz, 1982)
- Marx and Feminism (1984)
- Hookers in the House of the Lord (1983)
- The Ladies and the Mammies: Jane Austen and Jean Rhys (Falling Wall Press, 1983, ISBN 978-0905046259)
- Strangers & Sisters: Women, Race and Immigration (as editor; Falling Wall Press, 1985, ISBN 978-0905046297)
- The Global Kitchen: The Case for Counting Unwaged Work (1985)
- The Milk of Human Kindness: Defending Breastfeeding from the Global Market and the AIDS Industry (with Solveig Francis, Phoebe Jones Schellenberg, and Nina Lopez-Jones; Crossroads Books, 2003, ISBN 978-0954437206)
- "Introduction" in Creating a Caring Economy: Nora Castañeda & the Women's Development Bank of Venezuela (Crossroads Books, 2006, ISBN 978-0954437220)
- "Introduction" in The Arusha Declaration, Rediscovering Nyerere's Tanzania (2007)
- "Introduction" in Jailhouse Lawyers: Prisoners Defending Prisoners v. the USA by Mumia Abu-Jamal (UK edition, Crossroads Books, 2011)
- Sex, Race and Class—the Perspective of Winning: A Selection of Writings 1952–2011 (PM Press, 2012, ISBN 978-1604864540)
- Our Time Is Now: Sex, Race, Class, and Caring for People and Planet (PM Press, 2021, ISBN 978-1-62963-838-6)

== In popular culture ==
James appeared briefly in Steve McQueen's 2020 film retelling of the Mangrove Nine trial, entitled Mangrove, which formed part of McQueen's Small Axe anthology. James was portrayed by actress Jodhi May.

James was featured in How the Mangrove Nine Won, a film also released in 2020 giving first-hand accounts of the Mangrove Nine trial.
