= Heidi Hartmann =

Feminist economist

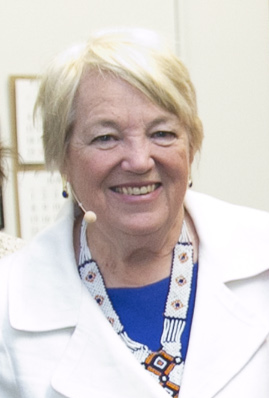
- Born: Heidi Irmgard Victoria Hartmann; August 14, 1945 (age 80); Elizabeth, New Jersey, U.S.

Academic background
- Education: Swarthmore College (BA); Yale University (MPhil, PhD)

Academic work
- Discipline: Feminist economics
- Awards: MacArthur Fellowship (1994)

Notes
- Thesis Capitalism and women's work in the home, 1900-1930. (1974)

Heidi Irmgard Victoria Hartmann (born August 14, 1945) is an American feminist economist who is founder and president emerita of the Washington-based Institute for Women's Policy Research (IWPR), a research organization created to conduct women-centered, public policy research. She retired from her position as President and CEO in 2019.

Hartmann is an expert on the intersection of women, economics and public policy. She is also a Distinguished Economist in Residence at American University, a nonresident fellow at the Urban Institute, a research fellow at the Institute for Economic Equity at the Federal Reserve Bank of St. Louis, and editor of the Journal of Women, Politics & Policy.

== Early life ==
Hartmann was born in 1945 in Elizabeth, New Jersey, the daughter of German parents Henry Leopold Hartmann and Hedwig (Bercher) Hartmann. Raised in Toms River, New Jersey, she graduated in 1963 from Toms River High School (since renamed as Toms River High School South) and was inducted into the district's hall of fame in 1989. She attended Swarthmore College, where she received a B.A. in economics with honors in 1967. Hartmann then attended Yale University, where she received a M. Phil. in economics in 1972 and a PhD in the subject in 1974.

=== Awards and honors ===
In 1994, Hartmann was awarded the MacArthur Fellowship Award—a five-year grant from the MacArthur Foundation given to individuals who show exceptional creativity for their research and the prospect for more in the future—for her work on women and economics. She is also the recipient of two honorary degrees.

=== Personal life ===
In 1967, she married Frank Blair Cochran, with whom she shares a daughter, Jessica Lee Cochran, then divorced a year later. In 1979, she married John Varick Wells and had two daughters—Katharine Lina Hartman Wells and Laura Cameron Hartmann Wells.

== Selected bibliography ==
Books

- Hartmann, Heidi I.; Helfferich, Emil (1981). Behn, Meyer & Co. and Arnold Otto Meyer: a company history. Hamburg, Germany: H.C. Verlag. OCLC 849723037.
- Hartmann, Heidi I.; Treiman, Donald (1981). Women, work, and wages equal pay for jobs of equal value. Washington, D.C.: National Academy Press. ISBN 9780585144702. Assembly of Behavioral and Social Sciences (U.S.). Committee on Occupational Classification and Analysis.
- Hartmann, Heidi I. (1982). El infeliz matrimonio entre el marxismo y el feminismo: hacia una unión mas progresiva [The unhappy marriage of Marxism and feminism: towards a more progressive union]. Lima, Peru: Centro la Mujer Peruana Flora Tristán. OCLC 711308316.
- Hartmann, Heidi I. (1985). Comparable worth: new directions for research. Washington, D.C.: National Academy Press. ISBN 9780585142845.
- Hartmann, Heidi I.; Reskin, Barbara (1986). Women's work, men's work sex segregation on the job. Washington, D.C.: National Academy Press. ISBN 9780309034296.
- Hartmann, Heidi I.; Moses, Claire, eds. (1995). U.S. women in struggle: a feminist studies anthology. Urbana: University of Illinois Press. ISBN 9780252064623.
- Hartmann, Heidi I., ed. (2005). Gendering politics and policy: recent developments in Europe, Latin America, and the United States. New York: Haworth Political Press. ISBN 9780789030931.
- Hartmann, Heidi I., ed. (2005). Women, work, and poverty: women centered research for policy change. New York: Haworth Political Press. ISBN 9780789032461.

== See also ==
- Feminist economics
- List of feminist economists
