= Ximena Cid =

Chicana and Indigenous physicist

- Born: Ximena Cid; Sacramento, California, United States
- Education: University of California, Berkeley; University of Texas at Arlington
- Scientific career
- Fields: Physics
- Workplaces: California State University Dominguez Hills
- Doctoral advisor: Ramón E. López

Ximena Cid is a Chicana and Indigenous American physicist; physics educator and physics education researcher; and advocate for increasing diversity and supporting minority students in STEM and physics. She is currently associate professor and past chair of the physics department at California State University Dominguez Hills. She is recognized as the first Latina student, as well as the first Indigenous student, to earn a PhD in physics from the University of Texas at Arlington. She is also recognized as likely the first Indigenous person to chair a physics department in the country. One of her research specialties is 3-D simulations to support the comprehension of systems such as gravitational fields, electric fields and magnetic fields. Ximena believes in fostering a community that encourages and uplifts a diversity of perspectives and cultures is important for making progress in STEM research, according to a 2025 interview.

== Early life and family ==
Ximena Cid was born in Sacramento, California, to Armando Cid and Josephine Talamantez. She has a twin sister. Her father was born in Zacatecas, Mexico, and was an artist who participated in the Royal Chicano Air Force in Sacramento. Her mother is Chicana and Yaqui, and was a cofounder of Chicano Park in San Diego, and also worked within the California Arts Council. Her maternal grandfather was also a member of the Yaqui tribe. Growing up, she and her family were involved in community organizing and activism in the Chicano Movement as well as the American Indian Movement, including marching alongside labor leaders and activists Cesar Chavez and Dolores Huerta. In high school, she played the viola as well as the violin professionally with Mariachi Femenil las Aguilas, the first all-female mariachi band in northern California.

== Education ==
Cid attended the University of California, Berkeley, for her undergraduate education. Prior to starting courses at Berkeley, she attended the Summer Bridge program on campus the summer before beginning the fall semester. During her undergraduate studies, she worked in a research position with Janet Luhmann as an advisor. She also supported herself through college playing violin in a mariachi band. She graduated in 2005 with a bachelor's degree in astrophysics, with a focus in space physics. At her graduation ceremony, her father, an artist, designed her graduation cap.

After her final undergraduate semester, during which she studied abroad in Italy, Cid returned to completed a summer research program with Ramón E. López at the Florida Institute of Technology. After a yearlong break, Cid began graduate school in 2006 at Florida Institute of Technology, with López as her graduate advisor. She studied there for one year, then moved to the University of Texas, Arlington, in 2007, where López had begun teaching. Initially, the physics department there did not accept Cid's research in physics education, so she spent the first two years teaching the faculty about different approaches in teaching and the impact it makes on student learning.

For her graduate thesis, she collaborated with cognitive science groups on campus in her research on visual spatial cognition with an emphasis on physics education research. Her thesis was submitted in May 2011 and is titled "Investigations in the impact of visual cognition and spatial ability on student comprehension in physics and space science."

Cid graduated with master's and PhD degrees in physics from UT Arlington in 2011. Upon receiving her degree became the first Latina student, as well as the first Indigenous student, to earn a PhD in physics from UT Arlington. In 2011, she was one of two Indigenous PhD awardees in physics in the country.After earning her PhD she Ximena joined the faculty at California State Univeristy, where she is currently associate professor and past chair of the physics department.

== Career ==
=== Academic appointments ===
After completing her graduate degree, in 2011 Cid began a tenure-track position teaching at Dallas College North Lake Campus in Irving, Texas, and training their faculty on physics education. After six months there, she then accepted a post-doctoral position with the Physics Education Group at the University of Washington in Seattle, Washington, with Lillian McDermott. She worked at the Physics Education Group for three and a half years, and while there became involved with tutoring members of the Indigenous community in Seattle; holding workshops for the UW Society for the Advancement of Chicanos/Hispanics and Native Americans in Science (SACNAS); and volunteering with other groups supporting minority students.

In 2015, Cid joined the faculty of California State University, Dominguez Hills, in Carson, California, as an associate professor. In April 2020, she became chair of the university's physics department. She is recognized as the first Indigenous person to hold the role as chair of a physics department in the United States.

=== Outreach work ===
Over her career, Cid has been member of the American Physical Society's Forum on Diversity and Inclusion; has served on American Association of Physics Teacher's diversity committees; and has continued to work with the Society for the Advancement of Chicanos and Native Americans in Science (SACNAS), of which she is a lifetime member. She has also served on the board of the National Society of Hispanic Physicists (NSHP). While on the board, she organized the Día de la Física (Day of Physics) to engage and support Latinx and Indigenous students.

In 2017, Cid joined a five-year collaboration between NASA Heliophysics Education Consortium (NASA HEC) and the American Association of Physics Teachers as a partner in efforts to develop research-based instructional materials. The group, based at Temple University, created a first-year curriculum related to the 2017 solar eclipse that was used in a summer program for students.

Cid organized an "Indigenous in Physics" meeting at the SACNAS annual conference in 2017. In 2020, along with Brittany Kamai, Franklin Dollar, Corey Gray, and other physicists, Cid helped launch the Society of Indigenous Physicists. The same year, Cid also helped lead the #ShutDownSTEM, #ShutDownAcademia, and #Strike4BlackLives protests to address anti-Black racism in academia and STEM fields.

== Select publications ==
- "Gender matters," Physics Today, March 2018 – with Jennifer Blue and Adrienne Traxler
- "Indigenous People Exist Within Physics," CWSP & COM Gazette, Fall 2020 (American Physical Society's Committee on the Status of Women in Physics & the Committee on Minorities of the American Physical Society's newsletter) – with Brittany Kamai, Xandria R. Quichocho, Angela Little, Kathryne Daniel, Corey Gray, Hilding Neilson, Julia Blue Bird
- "Demographics of physics education research," Physical Review, Physics Education Research, July 2020 – with Stephen Kanim

== Awards ==
- Homer L. Dodge Citation for Distinguished Service to AAPT, American Association of Physics Teachers, 2018
- Winter Fellow, American Association of Physics Teachers, 2021
