= Lynn Bolles =

American anthropologist (1949–2026)

- Born: Augusta Lynn Bolles; 12 December 1949; Passaic, New Jersey, U.S.
- Died: 8 February 2026 (aged 76); Mitchellville, Maryland, U.S.
- Citizenship: United States
- Education: Syracuse University; Rutgers University
- Occupation: Anthropologist
- Spouse: James Mackin Walsh
- Writing career
- Language: English

Augusta Lynn Bolles (12 December 1949 – 8 February 2026) was an American anthropologist who was a professor Emerita of women's studies and affiliate faculty in anthropology, African American studies, American studies, comparative literature and the Latin American studies center at the University of Maryland, and co-chair of The Cottagers' African American Cultural Festival.

== Early life and career ==
Bolles was born in Passaic, New Jersey on 12 December 1949. She graduated with an A.B. in English literature and anthropology from Syracuse University, and an M.A. in anthropology and a Ph.D. in sociocultural anthropology from Rutgers University. She is the daughter of Augusta Beebe Bolles and George Bolles. She married James Mackin Walsh on February 9, 1980, in the Kirkpatrick Chapel of Rutgers University in New Brunswick, New Jersey.

Bolles is credited as a path maker in Black feminist anthropology with theories focused on care and for paving the way for the Cite Black Women movement founded by Christen A. Smith. Prior to teaching at the University of Maryland, Bolles was a professor of sociology and anthropology and the director of African-American studies at Bowdoin College. She also served as president of the Association of Black Anthropologists (1983–1984), the Caribbean Studies Association (1997–1998), the Association for Feminist Anthropology (2001–2003), and the Society for the Anthropology of North America (2009–2011).

== Death ==
Bolles died of heart failure in Mitchellville, Maryland, on 8 February 2026, at the age of 76. She was survived by her husband and two sons.

== Selected publications ==
- Bolles, A. L. (2023). Decolonizing anthropology: An ongoing process. American Ethnologist, 50(3), 519-522.
- Bolles, A. L., Boellstorff, T., Dudgeon, M. R., Khandelwal, M. R., Kingfisher, C., Kramer, E. A., ... & Theidon, K. (2016). Mapping feminist anthropology in the twenty-first century. Rutgers University Press.
- Bolles, A. L. (1996). We paid our dues : women trade union leaders of the Caribbean. Howard University Press.
- Bolles, A. L. (1996). Sister Jamaica : a study of women, work, and households in Kingston. University Press of America.
- Bolles, L. A. (1987). Anthropological research methods for the study of women in the Caribbean. Women in Africa and the African Diaspora, 65-77.
- Bolles, L. A. (1987). Anthropological research methods for the study of women in the Caribbean. Women in Africa and the African Diaspora, 65-77.
