= March for Science Portland =

2017 protest in Portland, Oregon, U.S.

- Part of Protests against Donald Trump
- Promotional artwork for the event
- Date: April 22, 2017
- Time: 10am – 4pm
- Venue: Tom McCall Waterfront Park
- Location: Portland, Oregon, U.S.
- Also known as: March for Science PDX; Portland March for Science
- Type: Protest march
- Organized by: Portland Science Advocates
- Participants: Thousands – 10,000+

The March for Science Portland (also known as the March for Science PDX and Portland March for Science) was a protest held in Portland, Oregon. This local protest was part of the March for Science, a series of rallies and marches in Washington, D.C., and over 600 cities across the world on April 22, 2017 (Earth Day). Portland Science Advocates organized the march in support of science and to protest President Donald Trump's plan to cut funding for the Environmental Protection Agency and the National Institutes of Health. Funding for the event, which cost approximately $30,000, was crowdsourced.

Amid rainy weather, thousands of people attended the demonstration, gathering at a rally at Tom McCall Waterfront Park before marching 44 blocks of downtown Portland. Speakers included Earl Blumenauer, Suzanne Bonamici, and Elizabeth Steiner Hayward. Organizations that promoted the protest included the Audubon Society of Portland, Oregon Environmental Council, Oregon Health & Science University, and Xerces Society. Reporters noted organizers' attempts to create a political yet nonpartisan atmosphere, and participants' public criticism of Trump. The event featured activities for children and was described as having a family-friendly atmosphere.

== Background ==
=== Organizers and motivation ===
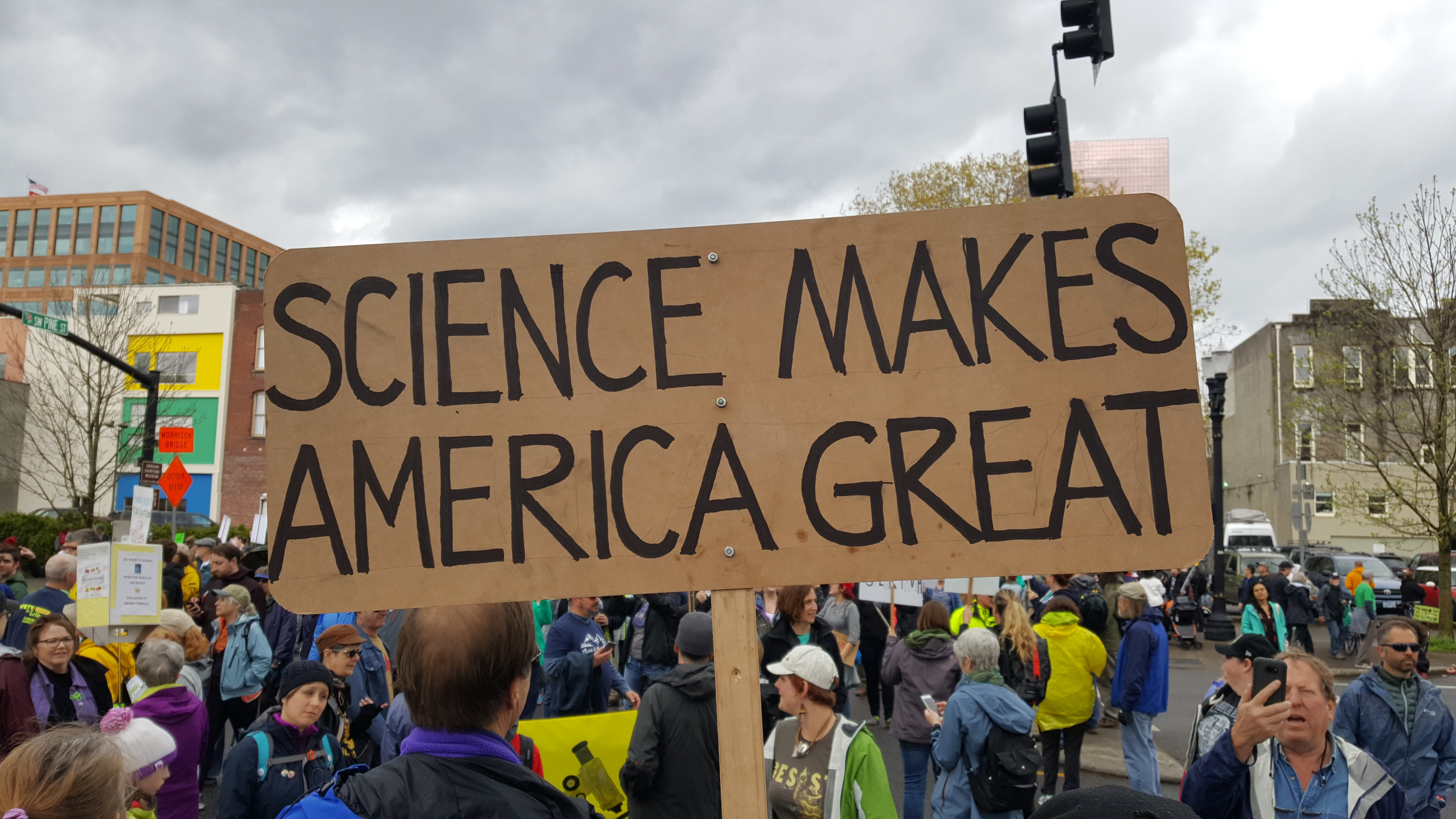
Handmade sign with a variation on "Make America Great Again"

Portland's March for Science was organized by Portland Science Advocates. The group was composed of people with backgrounds in various disciplines, including Jackie Wirz, an assistant dean at Oregon Health & Science University, and a store clerk with a passion for science and writing. The event's steering committee included co-chairs Curt Waltman and Wirz; additionally, Rich Hatfield served as communications committee co-chair and Sumi Malik, a transportation planner for CH2M Hill, served as community outreach co-chair. Alex Conley was also an organizer. The organizers met through the event's Facebook page, which was launched in February 2017, and sought advice from the organizers of the Women's March on Portland, which was held in January 2017.

Organizers wanted to support science and protest Donald Trump's plan to cut funding for the Environmental Protection Agency and the National Institutes of Health. The event was also to protest Trump's threat to withdraw from the Paris Agreement and decrease funding for scientific research and K–12 science programs, among other policies. Prior to the march, Waltman and Wirz wrote a guest column in The Oregonian, where they noted Oregon's achievements in science, and encouraged people to "stand up for science". They said, "We stand in support of scientific inquiry, researchers, availability of data and evidence-based policy", and invited people who "love" science to participate.

=== Preparation and planning ===
Funding for the event, which cost approximately $30,000, was crowdsourced. Obtaining a permit to host the event at the park cost $3,000. Monetary donations were accepted, and merchandise sales also funded the demonstrations. Funds were transferred through the Xerces Society. Portland Science Advocates was established as a nonprofit organization for members to continue the demonstration's mission after the march.

Prior to the march, organizers surveyed Tom McCall Waterfront Park and posted flyers about the event in the surrounding area. They emphasized that all people were invited to participate, not just scientists, and anticipated participation by approximately 10,000 demonstrators. Nearly 7,000 had committed to attending the event on its Facebook page. Organizers planned to use drones to help estimate the crowd size.

== Demonstration ==
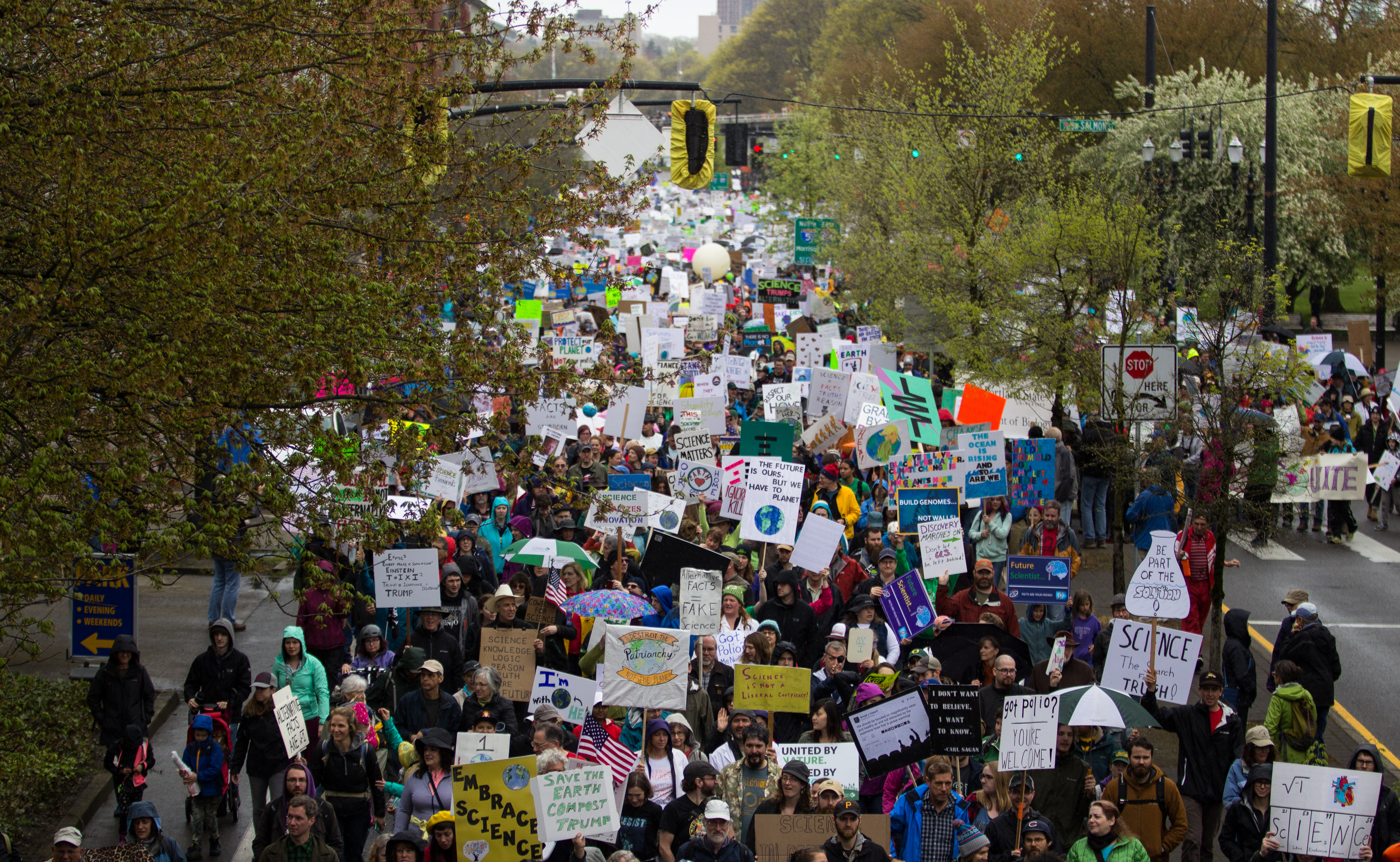
Protesters marching south along Naito Parkway

More than a thousand people had gathered by the time the rally began at 10:00 am at Tom McCall Waterfront Park, near the Morrison Bridge. Six business leaders, innovators, politicians, and scientists spoke at the event. Politicians included U.S. Representative for Oregon's 3rd congressional district, Earl Blumenauer, U.S. Representative for the state's 1st congressional district, Suzanne Bonamici, and Elizabeth Steiner Hayward, who serves as a Democratic member of the Oregon State Senate for the 17th District.

Blumenauer referred to the Trump administration in his speech, saying, "We have failed in the political process because they've made science partisan. They've undermined the credibility and confidence that people have, for example in science, dealing with climate." He also spoke about the importance of evidence-based decision making. In her speech, Bonamici said science should not be a partisan issue, and told the crowd: "We are going to go back to Washington, D.C., with all of you in our mind—this beautiful sea of science supporters, and fight for research, fight for science, fight for clean air, fight for clean water, and fight for our planet. So stay engaged, please. This is just the beginning."

The other speakers included Xerces Society senior conservation biologist Rich Hatfield, Intel educator and innovation manager Shashi Jain, and Gabe Sheoships, a citizen of the Cayuse and Walla Walla tribes of the Confederated Tribes of the Umatilla Indian Reservation, who serves as education director for Friends of Tryon Creek, and is an adjunct faculty member at Portland State University.

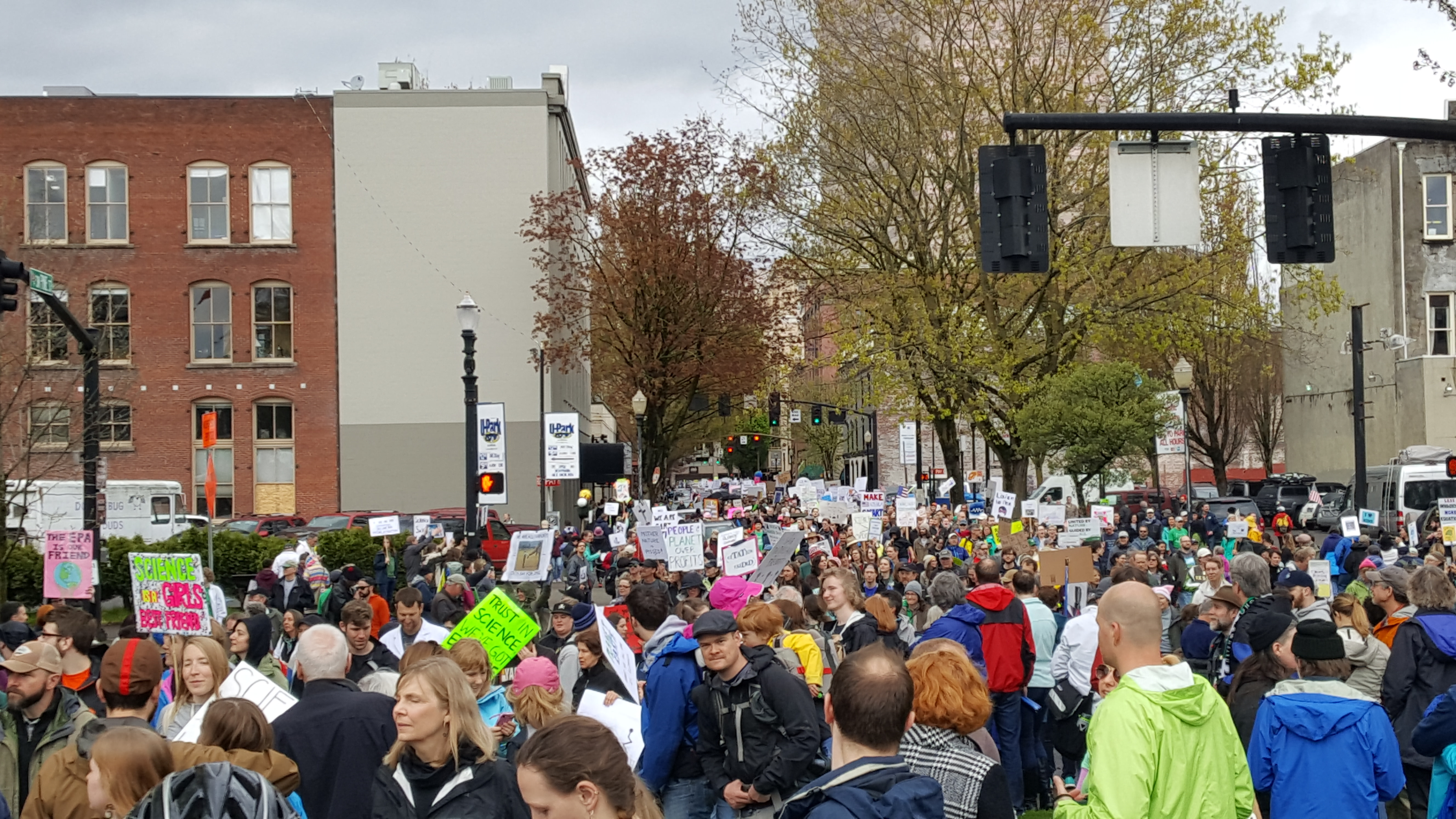
Marchers returning to the park

At about 11:00 am, protesters began marching south along Naito Parkway. They navigated a 44-block portion of downtown, before returning to the park around noon for a "Science Expo" and "Kid Zone", as well as live music. The route was identical to the one used during the Women's March on Portland; participants followed Naito to Jefferson Street, to Fourth Avenue, to Pine Street, then revisited Tom McCall Waterfront Park. Family-friendly educational booths and vendors were stationed near the park's Battleship Oregon Memorial. The demonstration ended at about 4:00 pm.

Amid rainy weather, thousands of people attended the demonstration. Some crowd estimates "far exceeded" the anticipated 10,000 participants. Many protesters wore science-themed costumes, such as bio suits, space suits, and white lab coats. The city experienced increased traffic because of street and bridge closures for the march, and other events.

== Partnerships ==
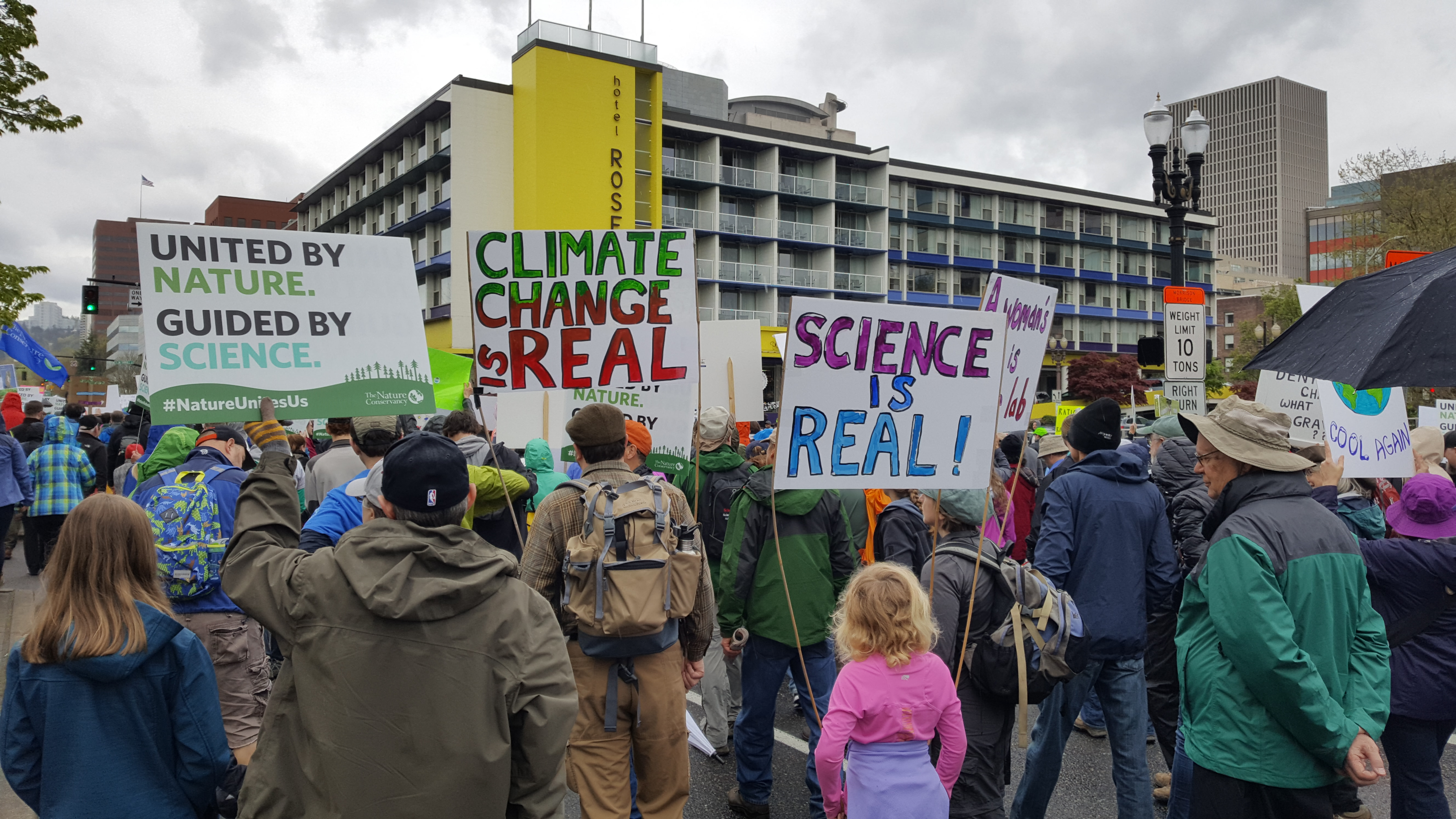
Protesters carrying signs, including one made by The Nature Conservancy.

The march was endorsed by the Audubon Society of Portland, Oregon Health & Science University, and Xerces Society, and promoted by the Democratic Party of Washington County, Oregon Environmental Council, Portland State University's biology department, and Rose City Astronomers.

The Center for Biological Diversity also issued a press release confirming some of its scientists planned to march in Portland and other cities throughout the United States. The educational nonprofit organization Science Project had a booth at the park. The American Chemical Society, which publishes Chemical & Engineering News, supported the parent March for Science demonstration as long as organizers remained nonpartisan; the trade magazine's former editor-in-chief, Rudy Baum, covered the Portland march. Portland's Badass Women's Protest Choir, which formed after the 2016 presidential election, also planned to attend.

The Audubon Society of Portland organized a sign making party on April 20.

== Commentary and documentation ==
Leading up to the event, The Portland Mercury's Erik Henriksen encouraged readers to join the march, writing: "Trump's hostility to science isn't just an attack on humankind's accumulated knowledge—it's an attack on all of us, and its repercussions will affect everyone on Earth, every day, for the rest of our lives. Time to fight back." KOIN said organizers portrayed the demonstration as "political but not partisan, promoting the understanding of science as well as defending it from various attacks, including proposed U.S. government budget cuts under President Donald Trump". Similarly, Maggie Vespa of KGW said, "Although organizers trumpeted the event's 'nonpartisan' platform, participants in Portland were quick to take aim at President Trump's proposed funding cuts to scientific research agencies."

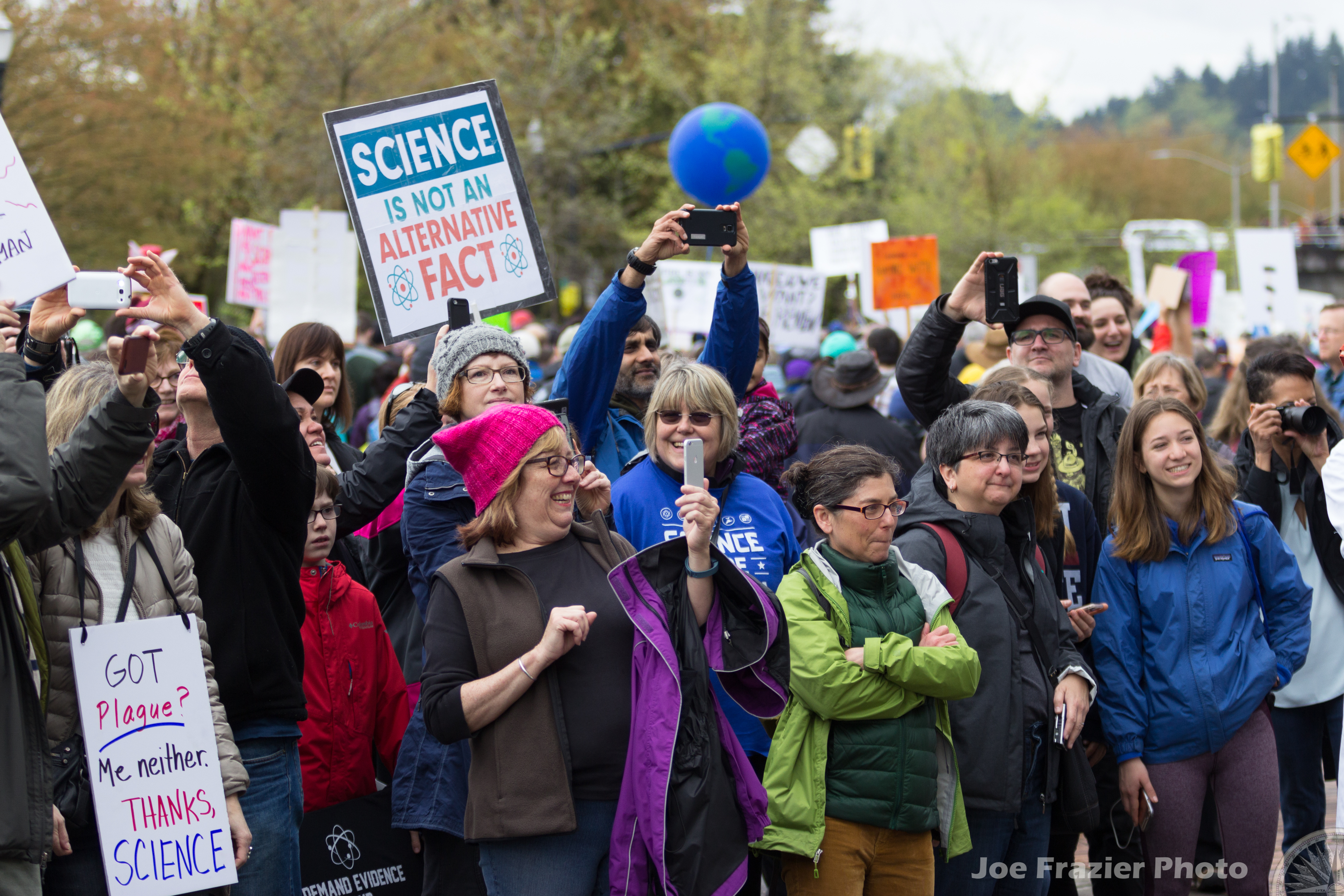
Demonstrators

Following the event, The Oregonian's Eder Campuzano noted, "unlike so many similar demonstrations—such as January's Women's March, the Tax Day March or several other downtown protests—this one skewed younger". Furthermore, he said of the event's family-friendly atmosphere: "Demonstrators turned out in droves with their children in tow, a fact many parents attributed to the fact that event organizers had provided a kids' zone near the Battleship Oregon Memorial with educational booths and live music nearby." Lyndsey Hewitt of the Portland Tribune noted, "The March for Science's crowd was somewhat calmer than the Women's March, which was an audience electrified, fresh off the heels of President Donald Trump's inauguration... The March for Science, however—announced not long after the Women's March—had a much more focused group of protestors."

One demonstrator, immuno-oncologist and filmmaker Tyler Hulett, documented the march and created the 8-mintute film, A Scientist Documents the March for Science. The film features people "whose lives and careers intersect with science and research", including a woman who believes funding for her cancer research work is being threatened, a couple who is worried about reduced Great Lakes Restoration Initiative funding, and a woman concerned about Portland's unfluoridated water. Hulett wanted to raise awareness about the people involved in scientific research, and said his goal was to "show that many of Portland's doctors and scientists are concerned about the lack of critical thinking coming from both sides of the political aisle".

== Subsequent events ==
Portland's second March for Science was held in April 2018 as part of the international campaign, and saw several hundred people march downtown.

In 2019, previous organizers of March for Science Portland held a science fair on May 11 called Portland ScienceFEST.

== See also ==
- 2017 in science
- Environmental politics
- Individual and political action on climate change
- List of environmental protests
- Post-truth politics
