= Jedidah Isler =

American astrophysicist

Jedidah C. Isler Ph.D.
- Citizenship: United States
- Education: Norfolk State University (B.S.); Fisk University (M.A.); Yale University (M.S., Ph.D.)
- Known for: Yale University's first African-American woman to earn a PhD in Astrophysics
- Awards: Kavli Foundation Fellowship (2016), Ford Foundation Dissertation Fellowship (2012), National Science Foundation (2007)
- Scientific career
- Fields: Astrophysics
- Workplaces: Vanderbilt University, Syracuse University, Dartmouth College
- Thesis: In Like a Lamb, Out Like a Lion: Probing the Disk-Jet Connection in Fermi Gamma-Ray Bright Blazars
- Website: jedidahislerphd.com

Jedidah C. Isler is an American astrophysicist, educator, and an active advocate for diversity in STEM. She became the first African-American woman to complete her PhD in astrophysics at Yale in 2014. She is currently an assistant professor of astrophysics at Dartmouth College. Her research explores the physics of blazars (hyperactive supermassive black holes) and examines the jet streams emanating from them. In November 2020, Isler was named a member of Joe Biden's presidential transition Agency Review Team to support transition efforts related to the National Aeronautics and Space Administration.

In January 2025, Dr. Isler was appointed as the Federation of American Scientists' first Chief Science Officer.

== Early life and education ==
Isler was raised in Niagara Falls, New York and then later Virginia Beach, Virginia. Her interest in astronomy began when she was 11 or 12 years old. Using the telescope that her sister gave her for her birthday, she began looking at the stars and actively studying for a professional career in science. Shortly before leaving for college, Isler's father left the family causing some financial turmoil that threatened to cut her studies short.

Since her undergraduate institution did not offer an astronomy degree, Isler decided to get a degree in physics. During her time as an undergrad, she completed multiple internships and summer research projects related to astronomy. She graduated magna cum laude with a Bachelor of Science degree from Norfolk State University's Dozoretz National Institute for Mathematics and Applied Sciences (DNIMAS), "...a program aimed at cultivating minority scientists who want to complete graduate-level work."

After obtaining her B.S., Isler went on to earn a Master of Arts (M.A.) in physics at Fisk University under the tutelage of Keivan Stassun, and later a Master of Science (M.S.) in physics from Yale University. She became one of the first three student members of the Fisk-Vanderbilt Master's-to-Ph.D. Bridge Program, a program designed to increase the number of women and under-represented minorities with advanced STEM degrees. Through this program, students obtain a master's degree from Fisk University, and then go on to Vanderbilt for their PhD. Isler, however, decided to go to Yale, instead, for her PhD .

In 2014, she obtained her PhD from Yale University in Astronomy where she studied astrophysics, specifically researching blazars. She became the first African-American woman to receive a Ph.D. in astrophysics from Yale. In an NPR interview, she recalled an exchange with one of her classmates during her first year at Yale. "So there are plates everywhere," she recalls. "And all of a sudden, [a white male student] in my class hands me a pile of his dirty plates...and says, 'Here, now go and do what you're really here to do.'" In 2014, Isler published her doctoral dissertation, In Like a Lamb, Out Like a Lion: Probing the Disk-Jet Connection in Fermi Gamma-Ray Bright Blazars, which earned the Roger Doxsey Dissertation Prize from the American Astronomical Society.

In an interview with Vanity Fair, she cited her role models as Mae Jemison, Beth A. Brown, and her mother.

== Academic career ==
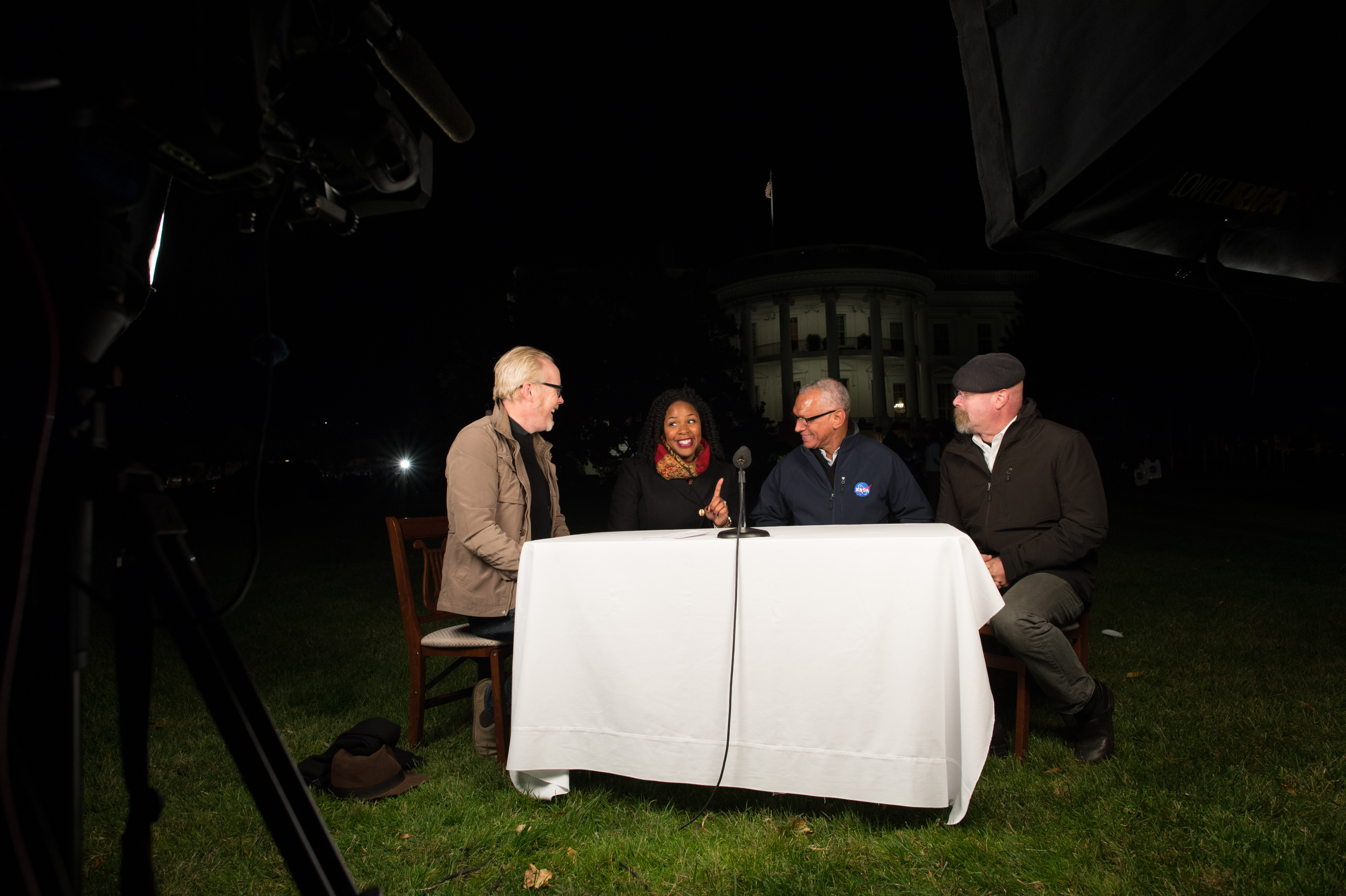
Jedidah Isler at the second White House Astronomy night with Mythbusters hosts Adam Savage and Jamie Hyneman, and NASA Administrator Charles Bolden on Monday, Oct. 19, 2015.

After achieving her PhD, Isler went on to conduct her research through a number of postdoctoral research appointments. From 2013 to 2015, she held a two-year Chancellor's Faculty Fellowship at Syracuse University. In 2014, Isler was awarded the Future Faculty Leaders Postdoctoral Fellowship at the Center for Astrophysics | Harvard & Smithsonian. Afterwards, she won a 2015 National Science Foundation Astronomy & Astrophysics Postdoctoral Fellowship supporting her research in the Physics and Astronomy Department at Vanderbilt University. In 2015, Isler was awarded a TED Fellowship. She is a 2016 National Geographic Emerging Explorer, and in 2017 she became a TED Senior Fellow. Isler describes her research as follows:

"My research focuses on understanding how Nature does particle acceleration. I use blazars –supermassive black holes at the centers of massive galaxies that "spin up" jets of particles moving at nearly the speed of light – as my laboratory. By obtaining observations across the electromagnetic spectrum: from radio, optical and all the way through to gamma-rays, I piece together how and why these black holes are able to create such efficient particle accelerators and, by extension, understand the Universe a tiny bit better. I'm also very interested in and active about creating more equitable STEM spaces for scholars of color broadly, and particularly, for women of color".

In 2019, she was named a member of the 2020 Astronomy and Astrophysics Decadal Survey's Panel on the State of the Profession and Societal Impacts.

== STEM advocacy and communication ==
In 2015, Isler founded Vanguard: Conversations with Women of Color in STEM (VanguardSTEM) as a signature initiative of The STEM en Route to Change Foundation (SeRCH Foundation, Inc). VanguardSTEM is a web series that features interviews hosted by Isler and featuring women of color in STEM, discussing academic and professional work and culture as well as current events. Featured scientists include Brittany Kamai, DeAndrea Salvador, and Naia Butler-Craig. The webinar's described purpose is to "create conversations between emerging and established women of color in STEM, where we can celebrate an affirm our identities and STEM interests in a safe space".

External videos
- "How I fell in love with quasars, blazars and our incredible universe", TED talk, March 2015

External videos
- "The untapped genius that could change science for the better", TED talk, August 2015

Isler has delivered two popular TED Talks, each with over 1.5 million views as of December 2020. The second of these confronts issues of intersectionality, specifically the marginalization of Black women in STEM industries and education, noting that:

According to Dr. Claudia J. Alexander's archive of African-American women in physics, only 18 black women in the United States had ever earned a Ph.D. in a physics-related discipline, and that the first black woman to graduate with a Ph.D. in an astronomy-related field did so just one year before my birth."

In 2015, in response to US Supreme Court Chief Justice John Roberts' comments in Fisher v. University of Texas (2016) asking, "What unique perspective does a minority student bring to a physics class?", Isler wrote a New York Times op-ed titled "The 'Benefits' of Black Physics Students."

In 2016, Isler was featured in Vanity Fair in a profile called "Saluting a New Guard of S.T.E.M Stars."

Isler has appeared in two episodes of the documentary television series How the Universe Works, describing astronomical phenomena and explaining astrophysics theories. She also has appeared in the television series Genius by Stephen Hawking, and National Geographic television series Mars.

In response to the murder of George Floyd and other Black Americans at the hands of police in 2020, Isler helped to organize the #ShutDownSTEM Day on June 10, 2020. The movement encouraged scientists to strike from academic work for one day in favor of learning about anti-racism, making personal plans to combat racism in their communities, and supporting Black colleagues.

== Honors and awards ==
- Senior TED Fellow, 2017
- The Root 100 Most Influential African Americans, 2016
- National Geographic Emerging Explorer, 2016
- Kavli Fellow Frontiers of Science Symposium, November 2015
- Curator & Host TED Conference, February 2016
- Host TED@IBM, October 2015
- TED Fellow, 2015
- American Astronomical Society Roger Doxsey Dissertation Prize, January 2014
- Ford Foundation Dissertation Fellowship, August 2012
- Edward Bouchet Graduate Honor Society, March 2012
- National Science Foundation Graduate Research Fellowship, June 2007
- NASA-Harriett G. Jenkins Pre-Doctoral Fellowship, June 2007
