= Strike for Black Lives =

Strike for Black Lives may refer to:

- Strike for Black Lives (academic protest), protest by academics during the George Floyd protests
- Strike for Black Lives (coalition protest), general protest during the George Floyd protests
