= Sarah Tuttle =

Assistant professor of astrophysics

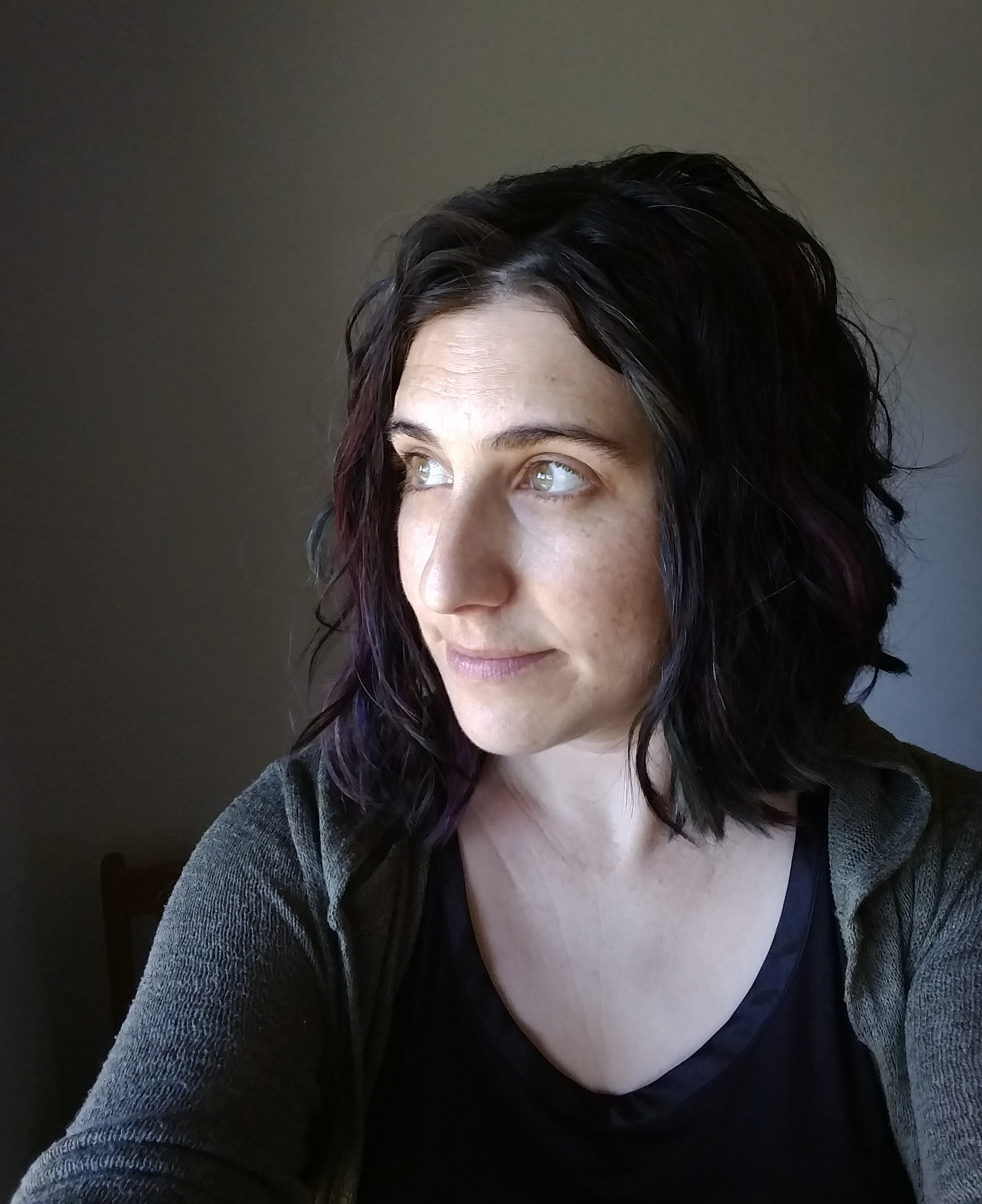
- Education: University of California, Santa Cruz; Columbia University
- Scientific career
- Workplaces: University of Washington

Sarah Tuttle is an astrophysicist and assistant professor of astrophysics at the University of Washington. Tuttle builds spectrographs to detect nearby galaxies, including work on VIRUS (the Visible Integral-field Replicable Unit Spectrograph) installed on McDonald Observatory's Hobby–Eberly Telescope to study dark energy, and FIREBall (Faint Intergalactic medium Redshifted Emission Balloon), the world's first fiber fed ultraviolet spectrograph.

== Early life and education ==
Tuttle was born and raised in Santa Cruz, studied physics at the University of California, Santa Cruz and graduated with a B.Sc in 2001. From 2001 to 2002, she worked for Add-Vision in Scotts Valley as a research scientist, and was part of the team that built the first screen-printed polymer light emitting diodes.

Tuttle received a M.Sc and M.Phil in astronomy from Columbia University in 2006 and 2007, and obtained her Ph.D in 2010, working with David Schiminovich on the Faint Intergalactic medium Redshifted Emission Balloon (FIREBall). Tuttle built the world's first fiber fed ultraviolet spectrograph, which launched on FIREBall in 2009.

== Research and career ==
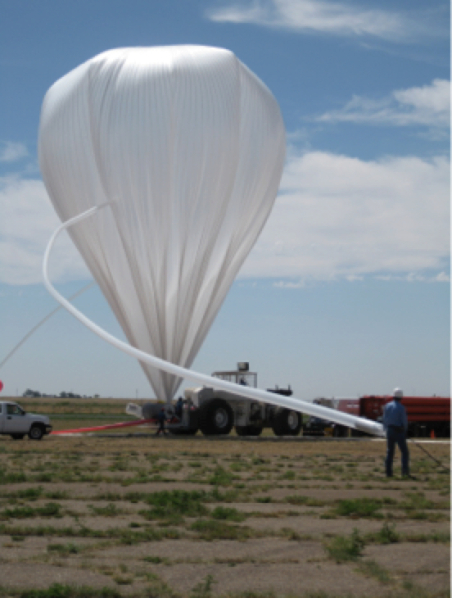
FIREBall (Faint Intergalactic Redshifted Emission Balloon), an experiment aimed at measuring emission from the intergalactic and circumgalactic medium in the ultraviolet, during launch

Tuttle's research applies novel hardware approaches to spectrograph instrumentation design, particularly aimed to isolate star formation regulation in galaxies through emission and infall from the interstellar medium.

During her Ph.D. at Columbia, Tuttle built the spectrograph for FIREBall, a balloon-borne telescope that is coupled to an ultraviolet spectrograph and designed to discover the intergalactic medium (IGM) in emission. The FIREBall spectrograph built by Tuttle was the world's first fiber fed ultraviolet spectrograph and placed upper constraints on IGM emission.

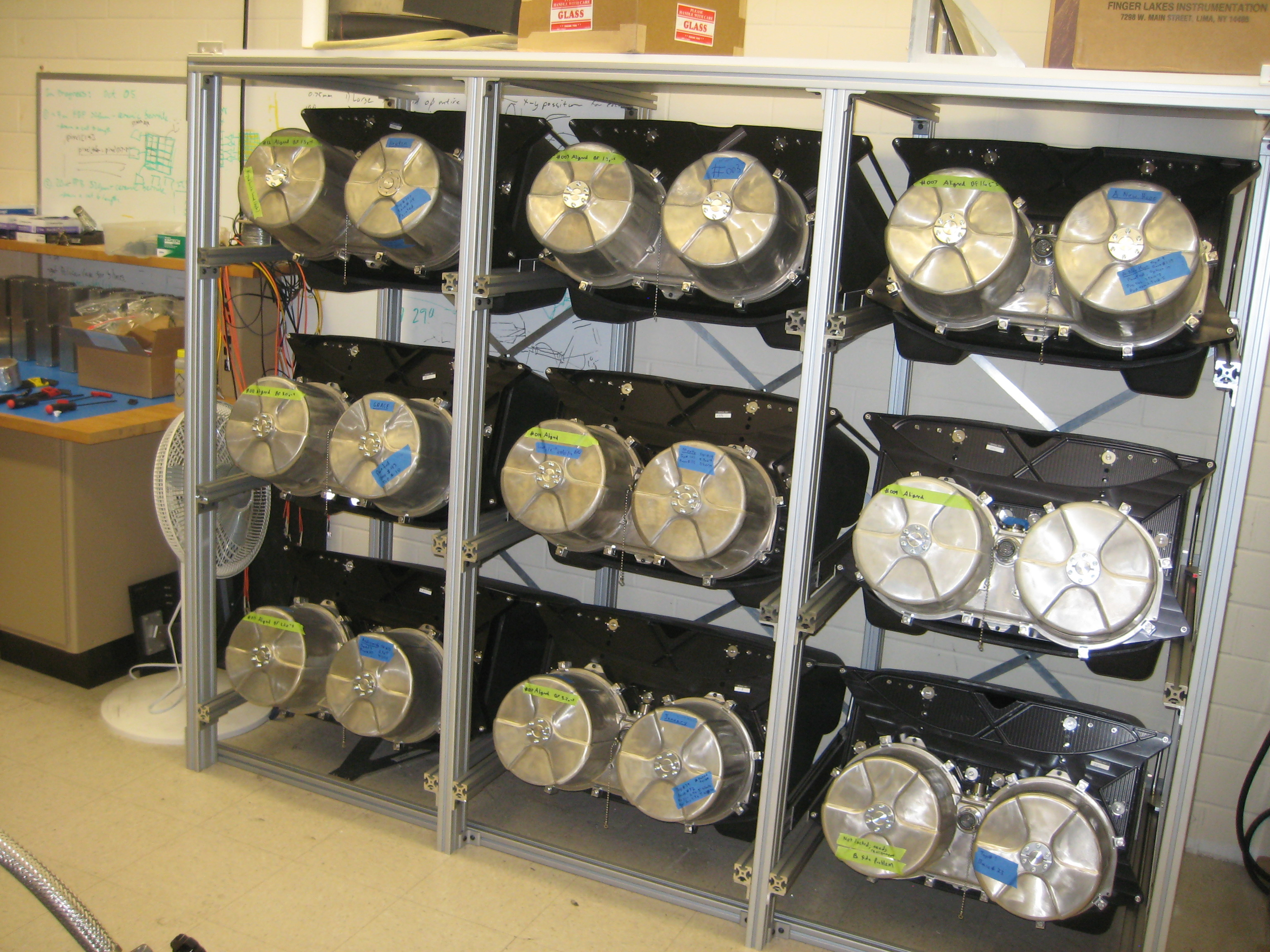
Nine of Tuttle's VIRUS spectrograph units awaiting testing for later installation on the Hobby Eberly Telescope.

Tuttle served as the lead for the Hobby–Eberly Telescope's VIRUS detector from 2010 until 2012, where she prototyped, finalized and characterized the VIRUS spectrograph. The instrument consists of 156 spectroscopic channels fed by 34944 fiberoptic channels, covering a 22 arcminute field of view. Tuttle and her colleagues' current astrophysics work still utilizes VIRUS data.

In 2016 she joined the University of Washington as an assistant professor. As of May 2019, Tuttle was leading the recommissioning of the KOSMOS spectrograph for the Apache Point Observatory, an instrument originally stationed at Kitt Peak Observatory.

Her science-outreach work includes appearances on the podcast 365 Days of Astronomy in 2009 and writing for The Toast in 2014. She regularly appears as an astronomy expert in articles in The Seattle Times, The Mercury News and Gizmodo. In 2014, the National Academy of Sciences honored her as a Kavli Fellow. Tuttle has also contributed to American Astronomical Society workshops and supported new guidelines to build a more diverse and inclusive environment.

== Activism ==
Tuttle was a board member and hotline operator for the Lilith Fund until 2016, a reproductive-rights nonprofit that provides Texas women with financial support for obtaining abortions. She currently serves on the board of Kadima, a Seattle-based Reconstructionist Jewish community.

Her 2015 response to Tim Hunt's statements about women in the laboratory drew international coverage and was featured on BuzzFeed. In an interview with Chanda Prescod-Weinstein during the buildup to the 2017 March for Science, The Washington Post cited a group statement by Tuttle, Prescod-Weinstein and Joseph Osmundson on The Establishment. Their article entitled "We Are The Scientists Against A Fascist Government" called for greater participation of scientists in politics and compared the political situation in the United States to early-1930s Germany.

She has produced numerous studies on the gender bias within astrophysics, including one published in Nature in 2017 which found women's 1st author papers receive 10% fewer citations than similar papers led by male 1st authors. She furthermore emphasizes the importance of supporting scientists from underrepresented groups.

== See also ==
- List of women in leadership positions on astronomical instrumentation projects
