= Theophilus Momolu Gardiner =

Bishop of the Episcopal Diocese of Liberia

- Bishop
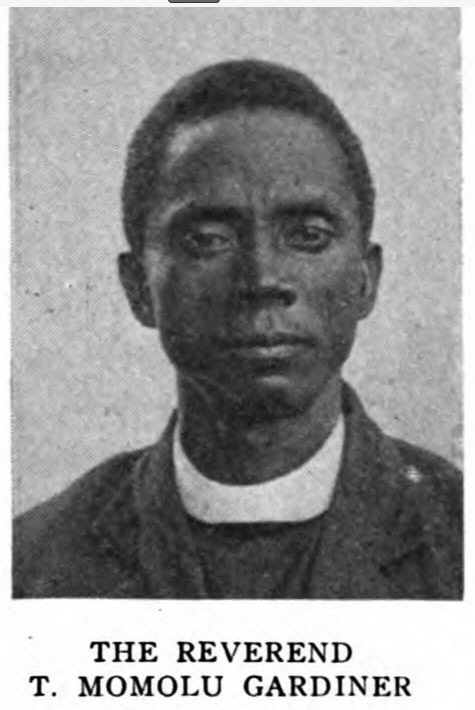
- Church: Anglican Communion

Orders
- Consecration: June 23, 1921

Personal details
- Born: 1870
- Died: 1941 (aged 70–71)

Theophilus Momolu Gardiner (1870–1941) was bishop of the Episcopal Diocese of Liberia. He was consecrated on June 23, 1921. His granddaughter is Wilmette Brown.
