= Margaret Prescod =

Barbadian activist, author and journalist

- Born: Barbados
- Education: Long Island University; Teachers College, Columbia University
- Notable work: Black Women: Bringing it All Back Home (1980)
- Relatives: Chanda Prescod-Weinstein (daughter)

Margaret Prescod is an activist, author, journalist and radio host. She was a founder of The Black Coalition Fighting Back Serial Murders and of Black Women for Wages for Housework. Prescod is on the executive board of the Center for the Study of Racism, Social Justice & Health, at UCLA's Fielding School of Public Health.

== Early life and education ==
Prescod was born in Barbados and emigrated to the United States in 1962 as a teenager. Within her first two weeks of moving to the United States she was on a picket line, protesting against a medical centre in Brooklyn that would not employ Black people. Prescod attended Long Island University for her undergraduate studies. She started a course at the Teachers College, Columbia University, but left to work in remedial teaching for adults. Prescod became increasingly active in the civil rights movement.

== Career ==
In the early 1970s Prescod started to focus her activism on initiatives that looked to improve the welfare of mothers. At the time she was working as a school teacher in New York City. She became involved with the United Nations, and was part of the series of conferences that were part of the Decade for Women. She launched the International Black Women for Wages for Housework program with Wilmette Brown in 1975. In 1980, she wrote Black Women: Bringing it All Back Home, the first book that explored the relationship between women, immigration and race. In 1985, she moved to Los Angeles, where she became involved with the Utility Workers Union of America. Prescod was involved with the Wages for Housework campaign, and delivered evidence at both the Democratic and Republican Party annual conventions. In particular, Prescod looked to involve women's unwaged work in consideration of economic analyses.

In 1986, Prescod founded the Black Coalition Fighting Back Serial Murders, which was established in response to the murder of eleven women in South Los Angeles. She was concerned with ensuring that the coalition looked to encourage the police and policy makers to investigate the murders and not to malign the victims. The organisation wound down in the mid-1990s, but was restarted in 2008 when the serial killer returned. In 2014 her efforts were turned into a film by HBO, Tales of the Grim Sleeper, which was nominated for an Academy Award.

She is presently the host and executive producer of the Sojourner Truth radio show which is broadcast by KPFK and syndicated by radio stations WPFW (Washington DC) and WBAI in New York City, named after the abolitionist and women's rights activist Sojourner Truth.

== Personal life ==
Her daughter, Chanda Prescod-Weinstein, is a cosmologist, science writer and equality activist.

== Selected publications ==
- Prescod, Margaret. (1980). Black women : bringing it all back home. Steele, Norma. Bristol, England: Falling Wall Press. ISBN 0-905046-09-9. OCLC 6996554.
