= Strike for Black Lives (academic protest) =

2020 protest

- ShutDownSTEM; Part of George Floyd protests, Black Lives Matter
- Date: June 10, 2020
- Location: Worldwide
- Methods: Walkout

The academic Strike for Black Lives and #ShutDownSTEM day were a mass shutdown of academia that took place around the world on June 10, 2020. The main goals of the strike and the shut down were to reflect upon anti-Black racism in academia and STEM and to commit to actions to eradicate it.

== History ==
In the wake of the unjust killings and police brutality toward Black people in the United States, Black researchers shared their personal stories and experiences of racism within the scientific community. This inspired group of researchers called for the academic community to reflect upon their role in contributing to racism and discrimination. In particular, the organisers called for the majority white academic community to consider their personal roles in perpetuating systemic racism. The day was organised by Particles for Justice and Vanguard STEM, an intersectional coalition of scientists and STEM professionals. On June 5, 2020, the coalition simultaneously launched separate written calls for a strike and shutdown at strikeforblacklives.com and shutdownstem.com, which provided resources and information about the day and its aims.

As part of the #ShutDownSTEM and #StrikeforBlackLives activities, researchers around the world were encouraged to stop usual academic work for a day: to read and engage with resources that challenge them, take responsibility to be anti-racist, and to create space for people who experience racism to be able to heal. In the build up to the event, Particles for Justice released a statement saying,

"We recognize that our academic institutions and research collaborations—despite big talk about diversity, equity, and inclusion—have ultimately failed Black people."

Organisers of #ShutDownSTEM included Brittany Kamai, Lucianne Walkowicz, Jedidah Isler, Renée Hložek, and others. The Particles for Justice organisers of Strike for Black Lives were Brian Nord, Chanda Prescod-Weinstein, Matthew Buckley, Kyle Cranmer, Djuna Croon, Daniel Harlow, Seyda Ipek, Sam McDermott, Matthew Reece, Nausheen R. Shah, Brian Shuve, Tracy Slatyer, Timothy M.P. Tait, Graham White, and Tien-Tien Yu.

== Impact ==
As part of the launch of the Strike for Black Lives, the organisers asked people to make a public commitment to participation. When they launched on June 5 over 100 distinguished particle physicists and cosmologists committed to participation. On June 10, thousands of academics, professional bodies, and institutions came together to take part in what was identified on social media and in the press as #ShutDownSTEM, #Strike4BlackLives, or the Strike for Black Lives.

== Participating organisations ==
- Nature Research
- University of Chicago
- Woods Hole Oceanographic Institution
- Massachusetts Institute of Technology
- ArXiv
- American Physical Society
- American Association for the Advancement of Science
- Arizona State University
- Institute of Physics
- Rockefeller University
- The Optical Society
- Software Underground
- University at Buffalo
- Boston University
- Society of Women Engineers
- The Earth Institute
- Harvard University

== See also ==
- Strikes during the COVID-19 pandemic
