= Chanda Prescod-Weinstein =

American cosmologist (born c. 1982)

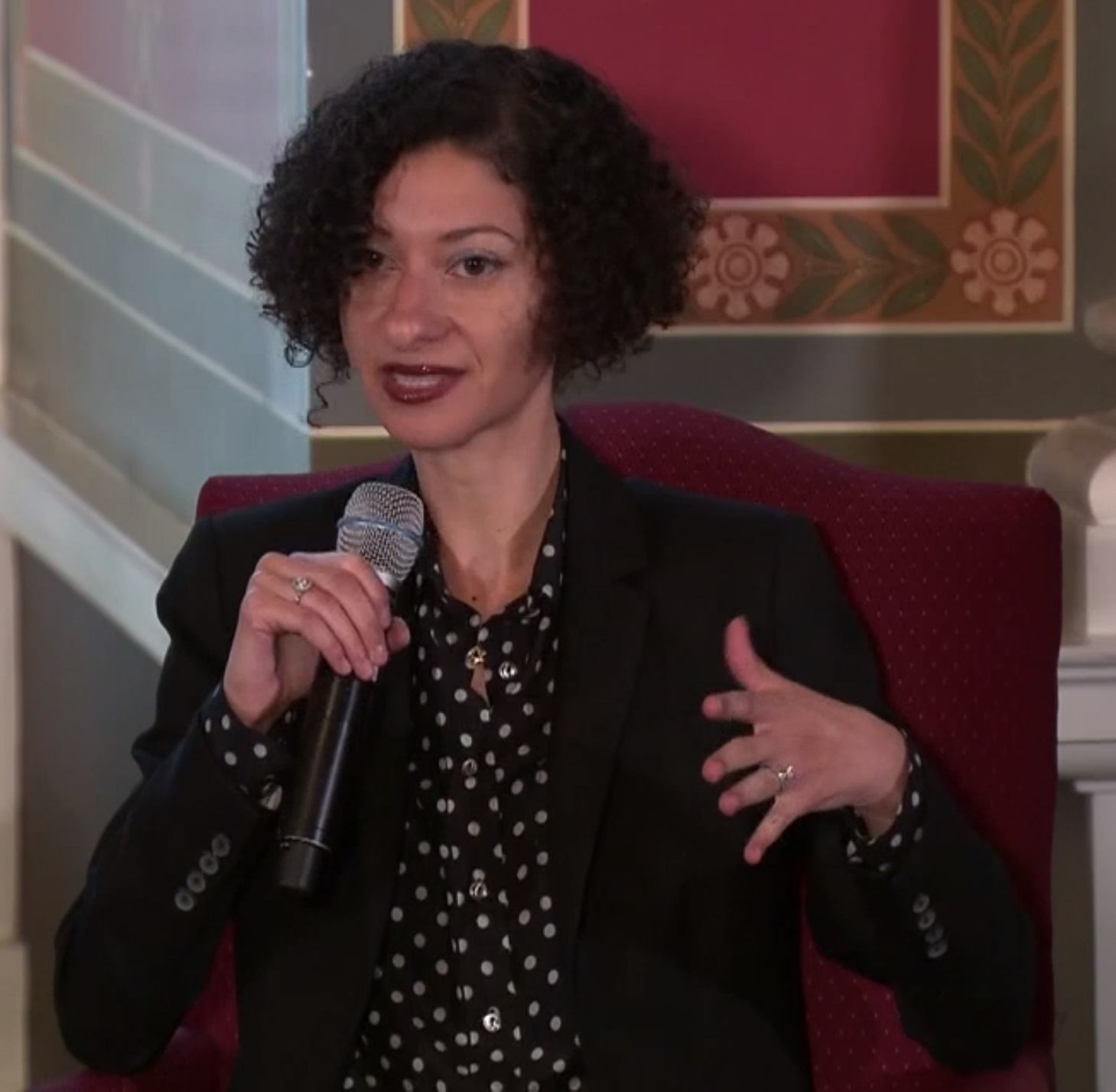
- Prescod-Weinstein at "Becoming Interplanetary" talk at the Library of Congress, 2018
- Born: El Sereno, Los Angeles, California, U.S.
- Education: Harvard College; University of California, Santa Cruz; University of Waterloo
- Known for: Political activism, cosmology
- Relatives: Margaret Prescod (mother), Selma James (grandmother)
- Awards: Phi Beta Kappa Award for Science
- Scientific career
- Fields: Cosmology; Particle physics
- Workplaces: Goddard Space Flight Center; MIT; University of Washington; University of New Hampshire
- Website: chanda.science

Chanda Prescod-Weinstein (born c. 1982) is an American theoretical cosmologist and particle physicist at the University of New Hampshire. She is also an advocate of increasing diversity in science.

== Early life and education ==
Prescod-Weinstein was born in Los Angeles, California, where she grew up in the eastside neighborhood of El Sereno and attended schools in the Los Angeles Unified School District. She is of Barbadian descent on her mother's side and Russian-Jewish and Ukrainian-Jewish descent on her father's side. She earned a Bachelor of Arts degree in physics and astronomy at Harvard College in 2003. Her thesis, "A study of winds in active galactic nuclei", was completed under the supervision of Martin Elvis. She then earned a master's degree in astronomy in 2005 at the University of California, Santa Cruz, working with Anthony Aguirre. In 2006, Prescod-Weinstein changed research directions and ultimately moved to the Perimeter Institute for Theoretical Physics to work with Lee Smolin. In 2010, Prescod-Weinstein completed her doctoral dissertation, titled "Cosmic acceleration as Quantum Gravity Phenomenology", under the supervision of Lee Smolin and Niayesh Afshordi at the University of Waterloo, while conducting her research at the Perimeter Institute.

== Research ==
Prescod-Weinstein's research has focused on various topics in cosmology and theoretical physics, including the axion as a dark matter candidate, inflation, and classical and quantum fields in the early universe.

From 2004 to 2007, she was a named National Science Foundation Graduate Research Fellow.

After earning her Ph.D., she became a NASA Postdoctoral Fellow in the Observational Cosmology Lab at Goddard Space Flight Center. In 2011, she won a Dr. Martin Luther King Jr. Postdoctoral Fellowship at the Massachusetts Institute of Technology, where she was jointly appointed to the Kavli Institute for Astrophysics and Space Research and the department of physics. At MIT, Prescod-Weinstein worked in Alan Guth's group in the Center for Theoretical Physics. From 2016 to 2017, Prescod-Weinstein worked as Ann Nelson's Research Associate in the High Energy Theory Group of the Department of Physics at the University of Washington.

In 2016, she became the principal investigator on a $100,533 FQXI grant to study "Epistemological Schemata of Astro | Physics: A Reconstruction of Observers" seeking to answer questions regarding how to re-frame who is an "observer", to acknowledge those existing outside of the European Enlightenment framework, and how that might change knowledge production in science.

She is working on the NASA STROBE-X experiment.

Since 2019, she has been a faculty member in physics and astronomy, as well as in women's and gender studies at the University of New Hampshire. She earned tenure in 2023.

== Awards ==
Prescod-Weinstein earned the Barbados House Canada Inc. Gordon C Bynoe Scholarship in 2007. In 2013, she won the MIT "Infinite Kilometer Award". In March 2017, Prescod-Weinstein won the LGBT+ Physicists Acknowledgement of Excellence Award "For Years of Dedicated Effort in Changing Physics Culture to be More Inclusive and Understanding Toward All Marginalised Peoples".

She was recognized by Essence Magazine as one of 15 Black Women Who are Paving the Way in STEM and Breaking Barriers. Prescod-Weinstein's personal story and ideas have been featured in several venues, including Huffington Post, Gizmodo, Nylon, and the African-American Intellectual History Society. She was named in Nature's list of "ten people who helped shape science in 2020" in January 2021, as well as one of VICE Motherboard's "Humans2020", "honoring scientists, engineers, and visionaries who are changing the world for the better."

She was recognized with the 2021 Edward A. Bouchet Award from the American Physical Society "For contributions to theoretical cosmology and particle physics, ranging from axion physics to models of inflation to alternative models of dark energy, for tireless efforts in increasing inclusivity in physics, and for co-creating the Particles for Justice movement."

Her 2021 work The Disordered Cosmos: A Journey into Dark Matter, Spacetime, and Dreams Deferred (ISBN 978-1541724709) won the Los Angeles Times Book Prize in the Science & Technology category, and in 2022 it received a PEN Oakland – Josephine Miles Literary Award, as well as being shortlisted for the OCM Bocas Prize (non-fiction).

== Activism ==
Prescod-Weinstein is an advocate for increasing the diversity within science by considering intersectionality and proper celebration of the underrepresented groups who contribute to scientific knowledge production. She has been a member of the executive committee of the National Society of Black Physicists. In 2017, she was a plenary speaker at the Women in Physics Canada meeting.

Prescod-Weinstein has contributed popular science articles for Scientific American, Slate, American Scientist, Nature Astronomy, Bitch media, and Physics World. She is on the Book Review Board of Physics Today and was editor-in-chief of The Offing. The American Physical Society described her as a "vocal presence on Twitter". Prescod-Weinstein maintains a Decolonising Science Reading List. She is a monthly contributor to New Scientist, with a column titled "Field Notes from Space-time", and a contributing columnist for Physics World. She was a founding member of the American Astronomical Society Committee for Sexual Orientation and Gender Minorities in Astronomy. In October 2018, Prescod-Weinstein was one of 18 authors of a public letter titled "High Energy Physics Community Statement" hosted on a website called "Particles for Justice". The statement condemned Alessandro Strumia's controversial claim at CERN's first Workshop on High Energy Theory and Gender that male scientists were victims of discrimination. Within a day of publication, nearly 1,600 academics had signed the letter in support. As of October 13, it had received nearly 4,000 signatures, including those of John Ellis, Howard Georgi and David Gross.

In June 2020, in the wake of the murder of George Floyd, Prescod-Weinstein, Brian Nord, and the Particles for Justice group organized a global "Strike for Black Lives". Prescod-Weinstein authored a note on the Particles for Justice page titled "What I wanted when I called for a Strike for Black Lives". On June 10, the day of the strike, more than 4,500 academics pledged participation in the strike. Additionally, numerous organizations, including Nature, the American Physical Society, the American Association for the Advancement of Science, and the American Institute of Physics supported and/or participated in the strike.

In March 2021, along with Nord, Lucianne Walkowicz, and Sarah Tuttle, Prescod-Weinstein co-authored an opinion piece in Scientific American calling for the James Webb Space Telescope to be renamed, citing Webb's promotion of psychological warfare as a cold war tool, as well as citing archival evidence indicating that Webb was a supervisor to State Department staff enforcing the Truman Administration's policy of purging LGBT individuals from the workplace, and had also directly participated in meetings with Senators during which he personally handed over a homophobic memorandum. The opinion argued that as someone in management, Webb bore responsibility for policies of purging LGBT employees from agencies enacted under his leadership. Prescod-Weinstein, Walkowicz, Nord, and Tuttle also started a petition, signed by more than 1,700 people, a majority of the signatories astronomers or those in related fields. These activities were part of a larger movement to rename the James Webb Space Telescope, including by the JustSpace Alliance, which produced a documentary on the issue. In 2022, NASA released a report of an investigation, in response to Prescod-Weinstein's claims, based on an examination of more than 50,000 documents. The report found "no available evidence directly links Webb to any actions or follow-up related to the firing of individuals for their sexual orientation".

In December 2022, The New York Times published an article by Michael Powell suggesting that Prescod-Weinstein employed false ad hominem attacks in an attempt to discredit Hakeem Oluseyi, an astrophysicist who did initial research debunking the claims against James Webb; Prescod-Weinstein is identified as having "propagated unsubstantiated false information" by continuing to label Webb a homophobe without presenting or citing any evidence in support of the accusation.

Prescod-Weinstein worked with two research assistants for two years to form a database of all professional publications by Black women with PhDs in physics-related disciplines, which was released in December 2022. She said she drew inspiration from the Cite Black Women movement on social media.

=== Jewish communal leadership activities ===
Prescod-Weinstein has in the past been a member of the Jewish Voice for Peace Academic Advisory council. Prescod-Weinstein also served as the Chairperson of Jews of Color and Allies Advisory Group of Reconstructing Judaism, the umbrella organization of Reconstructionist Judaism, and served on its board of governors.

== Personal life ==
Prescod-Weinstein is queer and agender, and uses she/her pronouns. Her husband is a lawyer. She is the daughter of author and activist Margaret Prescod and labor activist Sam Weinstein. Through her father, she is a granddaughter of feminist Selma James and the step-granddaughter of Trinidadian Marxist writer and historian C. L. R. James.

=== Views on Judaism ===
Prescod-Weinstein is Ashkenazi and Reconstructionist. She has described herself as an agnostic atheist, saying: "G-d is not necessarily a supernatural presence, but rather a concept that holds space for how we spiritually connect with our sense of what the universe is about, what life is about. For me, Jewish texts are an important ethical guide, something to think with." She regularly attends a Reconstructionist synagogue and has said that Passover is her favorite holiday.

== Bibliography ==
- Prescod-Weinstein, Chanda (2021). The Disordered Cosmos: A Journey into Dark Matter, Spacetime, and Dreams Deferred (hardcover 1st ed.). New York: Bold Type Books. ISBN 9781541724709.
- Prescod-Weinstein, Chanda (2026). The Edge of Space-Time: Particles, Poetry, and the Cosmic Dream Boogie. Pantheon Books. ISBN 9780593701683.
