= Ramón E. López =

Puerto Rican scientist

- Born: 1959 (age 66–67); Illinois
- Education: University of Illinois; Rice University
- Scientific career
- Workplaces: University of Maryland; University of Texas at El Paso; Florida Institute of Technology; University of Texas at Arlington
- Doctoral students: Ximena Cid
- Website: UTA Faculty Profile (Ramon E. Lopez)

Ramón E. López (born c. 1959) is a Puerto Rican physics professor at the University of Texas at Arlington whose research focuses on space physics and science education. He is an elected fellow of the American Physical Society (1999) and the recipient of its 2002 Dwight Nicholson Medal for Outreach for his contributions to science education. He is also an elected fellow of the American Association for the Advancement of Science (2011).

López played an instrumental role in the implementation of a hands-on science program in the elementary and middle grades of the Montgomery County Public School System in Maryland. He is also the co-author of a book on space weather titled Storms from the Sun which discusses the magnetic properties of the sun, solar wind, and how these effect the magnetosphere of Earth.

== Early life and education ==
López was born in Illinois to Puerto Rican parents. His father was a United States Army officer and surgeon and his mother an elementary school teacher. When he was a child his father gave him a telescope as a birthday present, and the Apollo 11 Moon landing on July 20, 1969 inspired him to seek an education in the field of Space Physics. When he was in sixth grade, his father retired from the military and his family moved to Freeport, Illinois, where his father set up his private medical practice. Years later, the family moved outside the town and he went to Pearl City High School. There his science teacher, who also served as an influential factor in his decision to become a scientist, taught him to do a small amount of computer programming.

López entered the University of Illinois where in 1976, and earned a B.A. in Physics in 1980. As a student he worked in the Physics Department preparing demonstrations and also wrote articles for the institution's newspaper. He was awarded a National Science Foundation minority graduate fellowship which he used to attend Rice University in Houston as a student in the Department of Space Physics and Astronomy. In 1984 he earned his Master's and in 1986 a Ph.D. in space physics (also known as space plasma physics).

== Academic career ==
López worked as a scientist for the Applied Research Corporation (on contract to the Johns Hopkins Applied Physics Laboratory) from 1985 to 1992.

In 1992, López went to work for the University of Maryland at College Park and served in the following positions: Research Associate Department of Astronomy (92-93), Assistant Director for Research East-West Space Science Center (93-94) and Associate Research Scientist Department of Astronomy (93-99). He worked very closely with Montgomery County Public Schools (MCPS) in Maryland to help implement a hands-on science program in elementary and middle grades.

López served as Director of Education and Outreach Programs of The American Physical Society from 1993–1999 and became the Chair of the Department of Physics at the University of Texas at El Paso. In 2002, he was awarded the Nicholson Medal for Humanitarian Service to Science. In 2003, he was co-Organizer of the Introductory Calculus-Based Physics Course Conference, sponsored by the American Association of Physics Teachers. He is also the Co-Director for Diversity for the Center for Integrated Space weather Modeling (CISM), a Science and Technology Center funded by the National Science Foundation. In 2004, he moved to the Florida Institute of Technology Dept. of Physics and Space Sciences and moved to the Department of Physics at the University of Texas at Arlington in 2007. Dr. Ramon E. Lopez serves currently as the College Board's Chair of the Science Academic Advisory Committee.

== Space research ==
López's research focuses on solar wind-magnetosphere coupling, magnetospheric storms and substorms, and space weather prediction. He has worked extensively on magnetospheric substorms, which are the episodic release of energy extracted from the solar wind and stored in the geomagnetic tail. His research studied the magnetic properties of the sun and solar wind and how these effect the magnetosphere of earth. He leads a research group that is working in both space physics and science education. In 2002 López and Michael Carolwicz co-authored a popular book on space weather titled Storms from the Sun: The Emerging Science of Space Weather with Michael Carolwicz.

== Scientific publications ==
Among the published works in which López has participated are the following:

- Predicting Magnetopause Crossings at Geosynchronous Orbit During the Halloween Storms, Space Weather, 5, S01005, doi:10.1029/2006SW000222; 2007; R. E. López, S. Hernandez, M. Wiltberger, C.-L. Huang, E. L. Kepko, H. Spence, C. C. Goodrich, and J. G. Lyon.
- Using Space Physics in Undergraduate Electromagnetism Courses; 2007; López, R. E.
- Active Learning for Advanced Students: The Center for Integrated Space Weather Modeling Graduate Summer School; 2007; López, R. E. and N. A. Gross; doi:10.1016/j.asr.2007.06.056.
- Field-Aligned Currents in the Polar Cap During Saturation of the Polar Cap Potential, J. Atmos. Sol. Terr. Phys.; R. E. López, S. Hernandez, K. Hallman, R. Valenzuela, J. Seiler, P. Anderson, and M. Hairston (2007).
- The role of magnetosheath force balance in regulating the dayside reconnection potential, J. Geophys. Res., 115, A12216, doi:10.1029/2009JA014597; 2007; R. E. López, R. Bruntz, E. J. Mitchell, M. Wiltberger, J. G. Lyon, and V. G. Merkin (2010).
- The Impact of Stereo Display on Student Understanding of Phases of the Moon, Astronomy Education Review, 9, 010105, doi:10.3847/AER2009044; 2007; X. Cid and R. E. López (2010).

=== Books ===
- Carlowicz, Michael J.; Lopez, Ramon E. (2002). Storms from the Sun: The Emerging Science of Space Weather (illustrated ed.). Joseph Henry Press. ISBN 9780309076425.

== Professional affiliations and memberships ==
López is a member of the following:

- American Association of Physics Teachers (AAPT)
- American Geophysical Union (AGU)
- American Physical Society (APS)
- National Society of Hispanic Physicists (NSHP)
- Soc. for the Advancement of Chicanos and Native Americans in Science (SACNAS)

== See also ==
- List of Puerto Ricans
- Puerto Rican scientists and inventors
