= Wilmette Brown =

Black American activist, organizer and writer

- Born: 1946 (age 79–80); Newark, New Jersey, U.S.
- Education: Wellesley College, University of California - Berkeley, University of London
- Occupations: Activist, teacher, writer
- Notable work: "The Autonomy of Black Lesbian Women" "Roots: Black Ghetto Ecology"
- Relatives: Theophilus Momolu Gardiner (maternal grandfather)

Wilmette Brown (born 1946), also known as Manisha Wilmette and Manisha Wilmette Brown, is an activist, organizer, teacher, and writer. She co-founded Black Women for Wages for Housework, an autonomous group within the Wages for Housework organization. Her 1976 speech, "The Autonomy of Black Lesbian Women," is an important text within Black feminist scholarship for its early discussion of the intersectionality of individual identities and corresponding oppressions.

== Early life ==
Brown was born in Newark, New Jersey. Her mother was born in Liberia; her father, Theophilus Momolu Gardiner, sent her to the United States as a teenager so that she could get an education. Brown's father migrated to Newark from Georgia. He was a World War II veteran who had several jobs during Brown's childhood, including teacher and postal worker, while also earning a college degree. She had a sister and a brother; her brother died in the Korean War at age seventeen when Brown was four years old. Her father died when she was a teenager.

Brown recalls watching coverage of the Rosa Parks protests and boycotts on television as a child. She became an NAACP Youth Council member when she was twelve, volunteering to register Black people to vote. She was a member of her high school's honor society.

== College years ==
Brown matriculated at Wellesley College in 1962 as a freshman. She returned to Newark the following summer and joined the Congress of Racial Equality, participating in sit-ins and picket lines. At the end of the summer, she attended the March on Washington.

Brown transferred to University of California, Berkeley, initially majoring in Russian and history. She became the vice president of the Black student organization and was named to the executive committee of the Peace Rights Organization Committee. She graduated with a bachelor's degree in political science.

While Brown was out as a lesbian by this time, she kept it to herself when she joined the Black Panther Party and throughout her time with them. She left the Panthers in 1969 because she disagreed with the role they envisioned for women involved in Black liberation.

== Career in education ==
Brown participated alongside students in the San Francisco State University strike to persuade the administration to form a Black Studies department. When the department was created, she was hired as an instructor, and taught a class on Black nationalism. University president S. I. Hayakawa fired Brown a year later, along with other faculty who had participated in the strike. She then moved to Zambia in 1971 and taught high school there for three years.

In 1974, Brown returned to the United States and settled in Brooklyn, where she worked with Brooklyn College for Project Chance, a group hoping to expand access to education for mothers on welfare. She did similar work for Queens College, where she was a lecturer in political science, in the SEEK program.

== Wages for Housework ==
Brown joined the group Wages for Housework in 1975, and in April 1976, she co-founded the autonomous group Black Women for Wages for Housework (BWWH) with Margaret Prescod. Brown and Prescod formed BWWH to focus on how oppressions based on gender, class, and race intersected for Black women on welfare, and how their situation under capitalism demanded a different kind of labor than that of other women under the Wages for Housework umbrella. Three months later, Brown spoke at the International Wages for Housework Campaign conference in Toronto in 1976, defining BWWH's causes and aims.

In 1978, Brown and BWWH successfully lobbied for New York State legislation that would ensure that student grants and loans would not count as income, ensuring these educational funds would not jeopardize their welfare checks. In Kenya in 1985, Brown and other BWWH representatives successfully petitioned the United Nations World Conference on Women to recommend the inclusion of women's domestic work in each country's gross domestic product.

Brown went on to help form similar groups in Germany and the United Kingdom. She left Wages for Housework in 1995 after twenty years with the organization.

== "The Autonomy of Black Lesbian Women" ==
A speech Brown gave in 1976 at the International Wages for Housework Campaign conference, "The Autonomy of Black Lesbian Women," is one of the seminal texts of Black feminist criticism. It discussed the intersectionality of racial, gendered, and sexual identities and how their overlap results in different forms of oppression.It was a forerunner of the Combahee River Collective's statement on Black feminism, acclaimed for its similar ideas.

Wages for Housework had highlighted how domestic work and the role of housewife were critical for a capitalist society to function, and Brown's speech delineated the particular ways in which Black lesbians' housework differed from that of Black men, white women, and straight Black women. Because of these differences, said Brown, Black lesbians needed to organize on their own, maintaining autonomy from those three groups, because "'the only way that we can be visible is to be autonomous...The only way for us to connect with other Black lesbians is to be visible...[W]e organize to be visible...to put forward...our own particular vantage point of struggle.'"

=== Autonomy from Black men ===
While Black men and women were united against racism, said Brown, women were often subjugated within their homes. Black men were better situationed to get good jobs than Black women, who then were forced out of the job market or into the least desirable paid work. Moreover, during the Civil Rights movement and the Black Power movement, women were expected to play traditional female roles, such as breeding and housework, which Brown characterized as "'subordination...to the power of Black men, under the guise of Black liberation."

=== Autonomy from white women ===
Because of societal racism, Brown said, Black men did not have access to the higher wages earned by white men, and therefore, nor did Black wives have the economic advantages of white wives. Under American slavery and its contemporary echoes, "'It is Black women who work as maids for white women and not the other way around...We are the whores. We are the illegitimate mothers.'"

=== Autonomy from Black heterosexual women ===
Finally, said Brown, Black lesbians "'refus[e] the working conditions of femininity that go along with servicing men sexually, [which] means that the Black woman lesbian is a superfreak. Because not only is she a freak in relation to other women -- because she is refusing that heterosexual work, she is a freak from Blackness as well. Because Blackness under capital[ism] is defined sexually.'"

== Other activism ==
Brown has spoken at numerous conferences and protests, including the Wages for Housework conference in Toronto (1976), the May Day demonstration in Naples (1976), Oberlin College's People's Conference on South Africa (1977), the International Socialist-Feminist Symposium in Paris (1977), United Nations World Conference on Women in Nairobi (1985), Forum 85 in Nairobi (1985), and Soil and Roots Conference (2021).

She has been affiliated with a variety of activist groups throughout her life, with a focus on organizations that work toward world peace, promote Black liberation, legitimize sex work, or demand wages for domestic labor. These include NAACP Youth Council, Congress of Racial Equality, UC Berkeley's Afro-American Studies Association (vice president), Peace Rights Organizing Committee, the Black Panther Party, Project Chance at Brooklyn College, the SEEK program at Queens College, Queens College Action Group, Wages for Housework, Black Women for Wages for Housework (co-founder), English Prostitutes Collective, Campaign for Nuclear Disarmament (councilmember), Housewives in Dialogue, Greenham Common Women's Peace Camp, Crossroads Women's Centre, and Traditional Yoga Association (founding trustee).

== Personal life ==
Brown came out as a lesbian in the 1960s. In the late 1970s, she moved to the United Kingdom to join the Crossroads Women's Centre, a London-based coalition of support services for women escaping violence.

Brown was diagnosed with colorectal cancer in 1980 and was considered cancer-free by 1985. She was a longtime vegetarian, although as of 2023, she eats fish to counter her Type 2 diabetes.

As of November 2025, she is a student and founding trustee of the Traditional Yoga Association in Reading, Essex, United Kingdom. She has edited new editions of several Hindu texts that were translated into English by her yoga teacher, Swami Ambikananda Saraswati.

== Selected publications and speeches ==
- "Women, Poverty, and Peace: Remembering Martin Luther King Jr.," 1985
- Black Women and the Peace Movement, 1984
- "Roots: Black Ghetto Ecology," 1983
- "Money for Prostitutes is Money for Black Women," 1977
- "The Autonomy of Black Lesbian Women," 1976
- "Black Women's Struggle Against Sterilization," 1976
