= March for Science 2018 =

- Part of Protests against Donald Trump
- March for Science demonstration in New York City in 2018
- Date: April 14, 2018
- Location: Worldwide

March for Science 2018 was a protest across the United States and internationally. It was planned to be like the March for Science 2017, being the second annual March for Science.

== Events ==
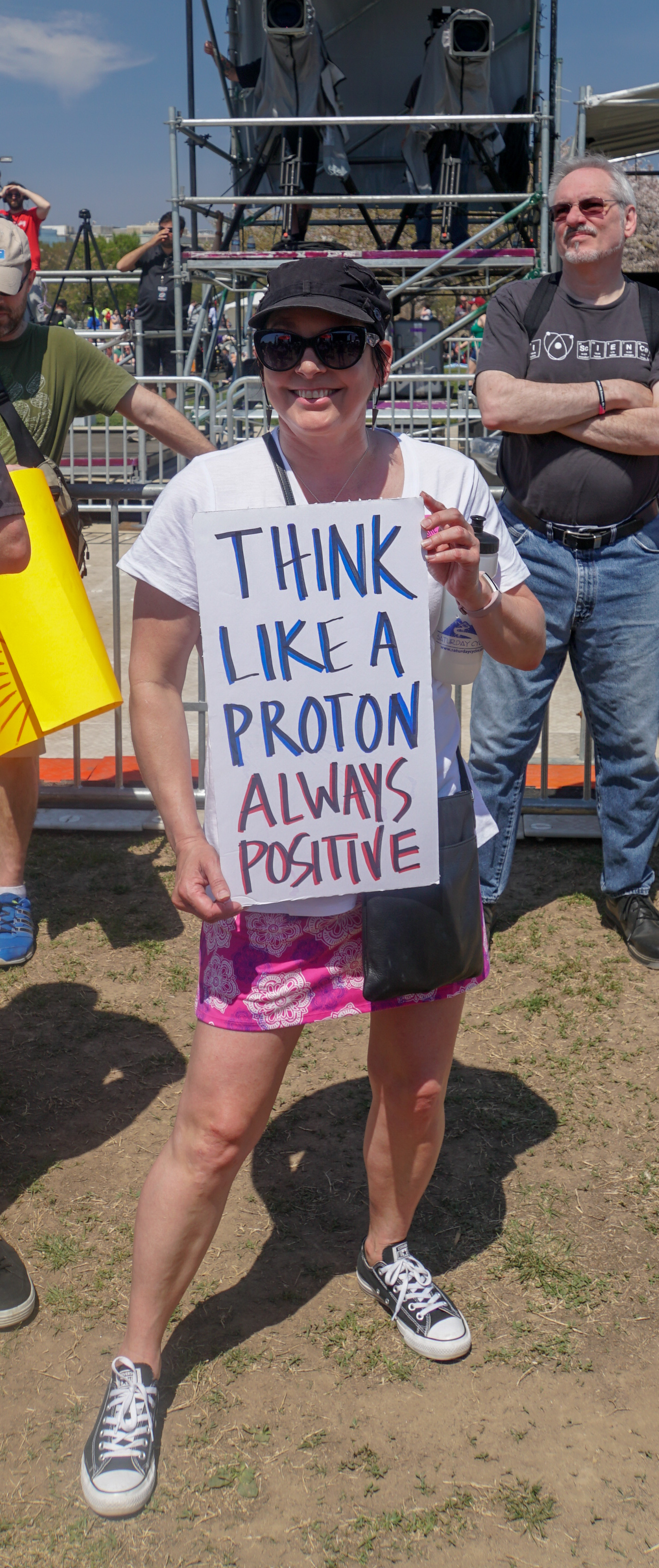
Participant in Washington, D.C.

The protests arose in response to the withdrawal from The Paris Climate Change Agreement, changes in sexual health education programs for teenagers, and actions to prevent researchers from publicly communicating their research. The protesters also responded to controversial cabinet appointments by the Trump administration, citing that positions requiring advanced scientific knowledge are being filled by appointees without proper experience in their field.

The 2018 March for Science organizers wrote a statement about themselves and what they stand for, reading, " We are people who value science and recognize how science serves. We come from all races, all religions, all gender identities, all sexual orientations, all abilities, all socioeconomic backgrounds, all political perspectives, and all nationalities. Our diversity is our greatest strength: a wealth of opinions, perspectives, and ideas is critical for the scientific process. What unites us is a love of science, and an insatiable curiosity. We all recognize that science is everywhere and affects everyone."

== Activities ==
=== United States ===
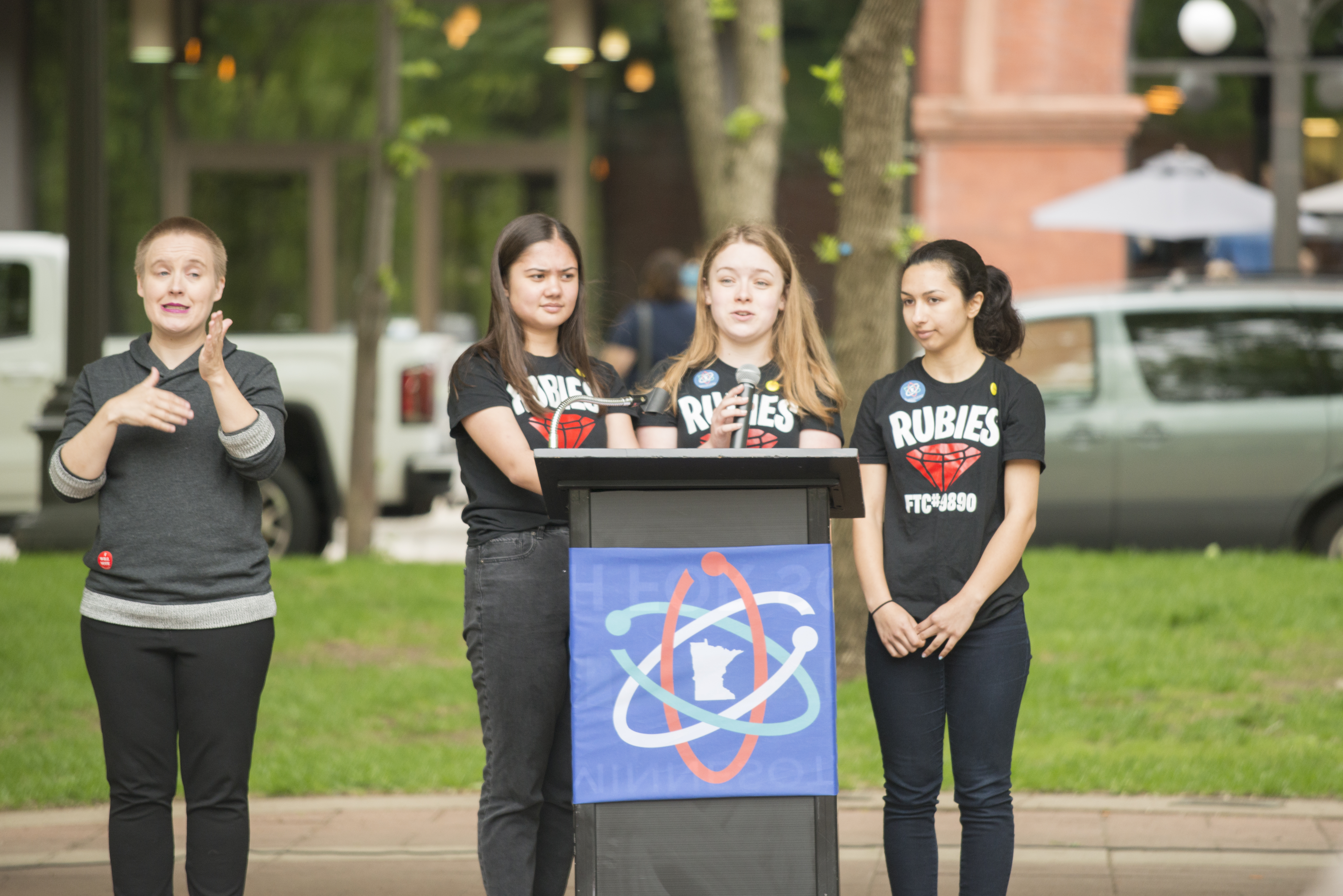
Student speakers in St. Paul, Minnesota

Cities with events include:

- Albany, New York
- Atlanta
- Boston
- Buffalo, New York
- Charlottesville, Virginia
- Chicago
- Chico, California
- Cleveland
- Fullerton, California
- Iowa City, Iowa
- Nashville
- New York City
- Orlando, Florida
- Rochester, New York
- Saint Paul, Minnesota
- San Antonio, Texas
- Santa Barbara, California
- Trenton, New Jersey
- Washington, D.C.
- White Salmon, Washington

=== Outside the United States ===
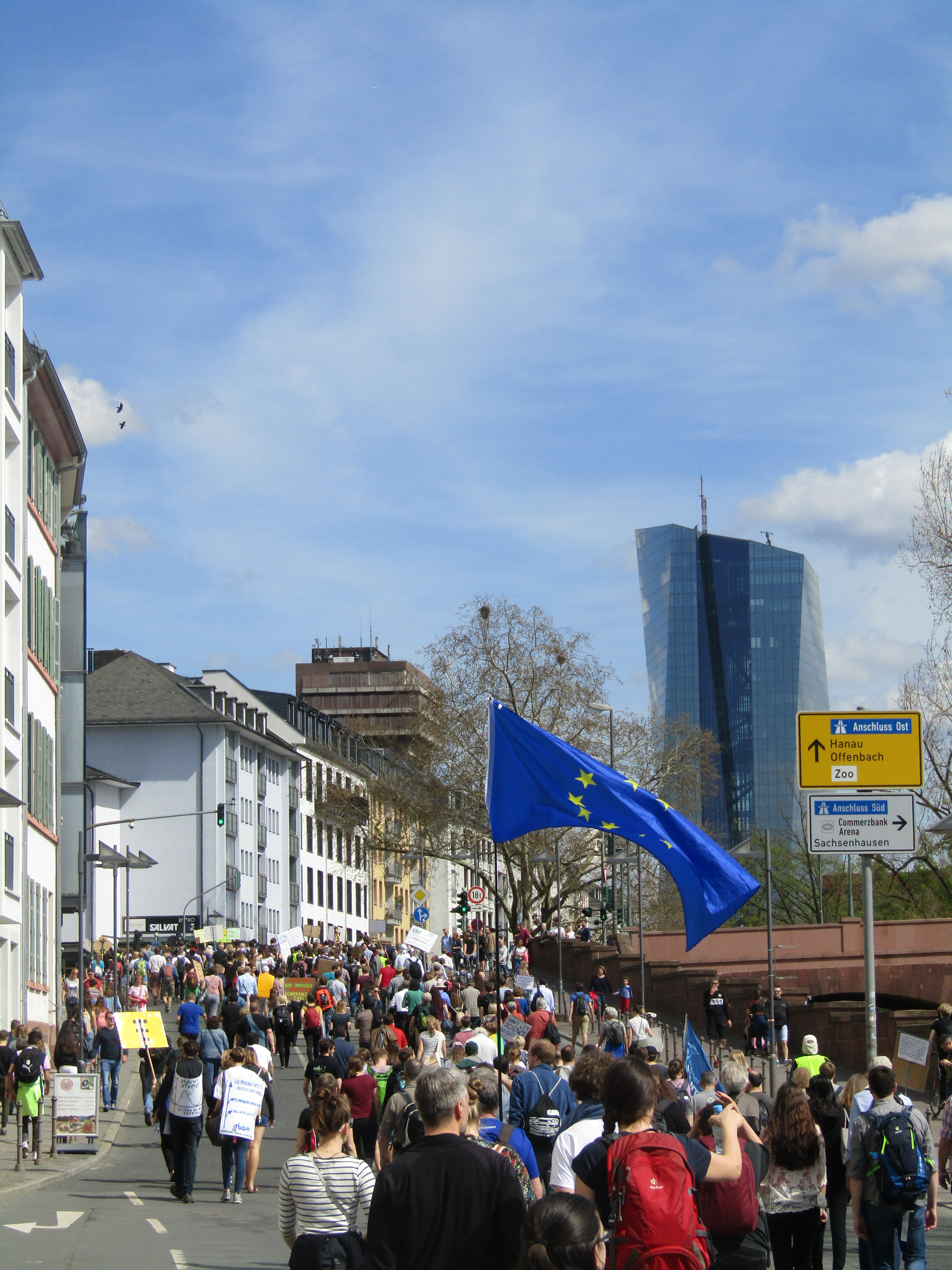
March for Science in Frankfurt

- Australia
- Germany: Braunschweig, Bremen, Coblenz, Dresden, Frankfurt, Göttingen, Kassel, Kiel, Munich, Münster, Neuruppin, Cologne, Saarbrücken, Stuttgart, Trier
- India
- United Kingdom: London
- Canada: Toronto
- Ukraine: Kyiv (about 300 people took part in a March for Science on 14 April 2018)

== Partners ==
Groups that have partnered or backed the march include the American Association for the Advancement of Science, The Nature Conservancy, the National Science Teachers Association, the American Geophysical Union, and the American Association of Anatomists.

== See also ==
- List of 2017 March for Science locations
- March for Science
- March for Science Portland
