= Jennifer Blue =

American physics educator

- Awards: Fellow of the American Physical Society (2023) Homer L. Dodge Citation for Distinguished Services to AAPT (2024)
- Scientific career
- Institutions: University of Minnesota, Duke University, Saint Mary’s School, Technical Community College, University of Maine, Miami University

Jennifer Blue is an American physics educator whose research focuses on gender issues in physics education. She is a professor of physics and associate dean of the College of Arts and Science at Miami University in Ohio.

== Education and career ==
Blue was a physics major at Haverford College, graduating in 1991. After earning a master's degree in physics in 1994 from the University of Minnesota, she continued there for a Ph.D. in science education, completed in 1997.

After working as a secondary-school science teacher at Saint Mary's School (Raleigh, North Carolina) and as a mathematics lecturer at Durham Technical Community College, she became an assistant professor of physics in 2001 at the University of Maine at Farmington. She moved to Miami University in 2002 as a visiting assistant professor, and obtained a regular-rank assistant professorship there in 2005. She was promoted to associate professor in 2011 and full professor in 2019. She has been associate dean of the College of Arts and Science since 2021.

== Recognition ==
Blue was named a Fellow of the American Physical Society (APS) in 2023, after a nomination from the APS Forum on Diversity and Inclusion, "for conducting pioneering investigations into gender dynamics in physics and providing highly effective advocacy for marginalized communities in physics and astronomy". She is the recipient of the 2024 Homer L. Dodge Citation for Distinguished Service to AAPT, “for her long standing leadership in pioneering efforts to establish, and encourage others to establish, a sound research basis that will lead to solving the issue of diversity, equity, and inclusion in the study of physics”.
