= March for Science =

Series of rallies and marches on Earth Day

- Part of Protests against Donald Trump
- Date: April 22, 2017
- Location: Worldwide
- Caused by: Donald Trump administration's views on climate change and science The misrepresentation and exclusion of scientific knowledge in policy decisions
- Methods: Protest march

Lead figures
Co-chairs & National Steering Committee: Caroline Weinberg; Valorie Aquino; Jonathan Berman; Sofia Ahsanuddin; Lucky Tran; Joanna Spencer-Segal; Rosalyn LaPier	Honorary co-chairs: Bill Nye; Mona Hanna-Attisha; Lydia Villa-Komaroff

Number
- Hundreds of thousands (Global)

External audio
- "Political Science: Out of the lab and into the streets", Distillations Podcast, Science History Institute

The March for Science (formerly known as the Scientists' March on Washington) was an international series of rallies and marches held on Earth Day. The inaugural march was held on April 22, 2017, in Washington, D.C., and more than 600 other cities across the world. According to organizers, the march was a non-partisan movement to celebrate science and the role it plays in everyday lives. The goals of the marches and rallies were to emphasize that science upholds the common good and to call for evidence-based policy in the public's best interest. The March for Science organizers, estimated global attendance at 1.07 million, with 100,000 participants estimated for the main March in Washington, D.C., 70,000 in Boston, 60,000 in Chicago, 50,000 in Los Angeles, 50,000 in San Francisco, 20,000 in Seattle, 14,000 in Phoenix, and 11,000 in Berlin.

A second March for Science was held April 14, 2018. 230 satellite events around the world participated in the 2nd annual event, including New York City, Abuja, Nigeria, and Baraut, India. A third March for Science took place on May 22, 2019, this time with 150 locations around the world participating.

The March for Science organizers and supporters said that support for science should be nonpartisan. The march was organized by scientists skeptical of the agenda of the Trump administration, and critical of Trump administration policies widely viewed as hostile to science. The march's website stated that an "American government that ignores science to pursue ideological agendas endangers the world."

Particular issues of science policy raised by the marchers include support for evidence-based policymaking, as well as support for government funding for scientific research, government transparency, and government acceptance of the scientific consensus on climate change and evolution. The march was part of growing political activity by American scientists in the wake of the November 2016 elections and the 2017 Women's March.

Robert N. Proctor, a historian of science at Stanford University, stated that the March for Science was "pretty unprecedented in terms of the scale and breadth of the scientific community that's involved" and was rooted in "a broader perception of a massive attack on sacred notions of truth that are sacred to the scientific community."

== Background ==
=== Donald Trump ===
In 2012, Donald Trump referred to climate change as a hoax. As a presidential candidate, he promised to resume construction of the Keystone XL Pipeline and roll back U.S. Environmental Protection Agency (EPA) regulations adopted by the Obama administration.

After Trump's election, his first transition team sought out specific U.S. Department of Energy (DOE) employees who had worked on climate change during the Obama administration. Prior to Trump's inauguration, many climate scientists began downloading climate data from government websites that they feared might be deleted by the Trump administration. Other actions taken or promised by the Trump administration inspired the march, including pulling out of the Paris Agreement, the stances of his Cabinet nominees, the freezing of research grants, and a gag order placed on scientists in the EPA regarding dissemination of their research findings. In February 2017, William Happer, a possible Trump science advisor with skeptical views on human caused global warming, described an area of climate science as "really more like a cult" and its practitioners "glassy-eyed". ScienceInsider reported Trump's first budget request as "A grim budget day for U.S. science" because it contained major funding cuts to NOAA's research and satellite programs, the EPA's Office of Research and Development, the DOE's Office of Science and energy programs, the U.S. Geological Survey, the National Institutes of Health, and other science agencies.

=== International solidarity ===
International sister marches were planned for countries around the world. These both supported American scientists and climate scientists more generally, and protested against other impingements on academic freedom internationally, such as government action against the Central European University in Hungary and the closure of educational institutes and dismissal of academics in the 2016–17 Turkish purges, as well as local issues.

== Planning and participants ==
There needs to be a Scientists' March on Washington.

— Beaverteeth92's original proposal on Reddit

A major source of inspiration behind the planning of the march was the 2017 Women's March of January 21, 2017. The specific idea to create a march originated from a Reddit discussion thread about the removal of references to climate change from the White House website. In the discussion, an anonymous poster named "Beaverteeth92" made a comment regarding the need for a "Scientist's March on Washington". Dozens of Reddit users responded positively to the proposal. Jonathan Berman, a postdoctoral fellow at the University of Texas Health Science Center and a participant in the original conversation, created a Facebook page, Twitter feed and website to organize a march. The Facebook group grew from 200 members to 300,000 in less than a week, growing to 800,000 members. Individual scientists have both applauded and criticized this development.

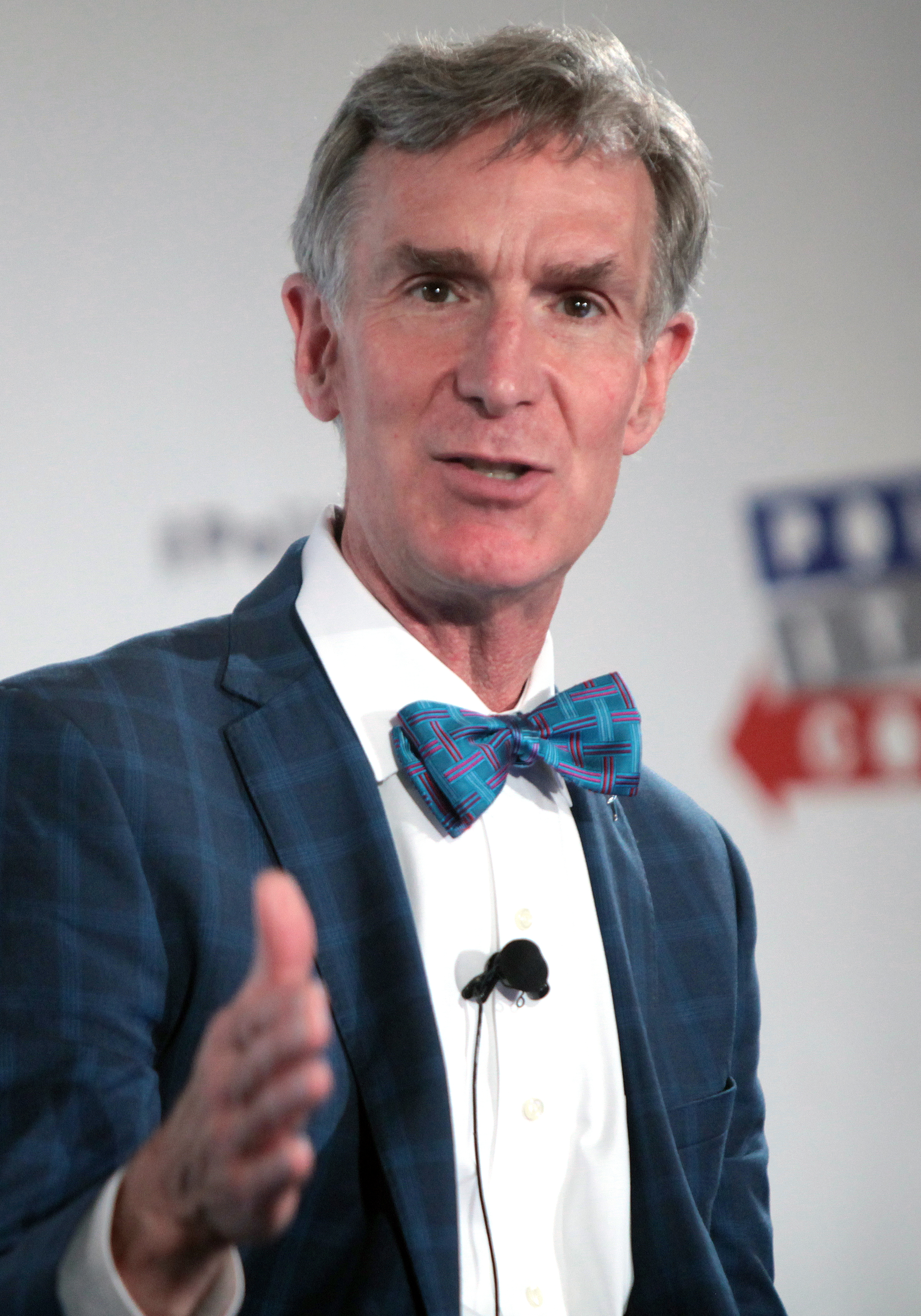
Bill Nye, honorary co-chair

It was announced on March 30 that Bill Nye, Mona Hanna-Attisha, and Lydia Villa-Komaroff would headline the march, and serve as honorary co-chairs. The protest was set to occur on Earth Day, with satellite rallies planned in hundreds of cities across the world.

For the inaugural march in Washington, D.C., the National Committee consisted of (in alphabetic order):

Sofia Ahsanuddin, Valorie V. Aquino, Jonathan Berman, Teon L. Brooks, Beka Economopoulos, Kate Gage, Kristen Gunther, Kishore Hari, Sloane Henningsen, Rachael Holloway, Aaron Huertas, Ayana Elizabeth Johnson, Rosalyn LaPier, Julia MacFall, Adam Miller, Lina Miller, Caitlin Pharo, Jennifer Redig, Joanna Spencer-Segal, Lucky Tran, Courtnie Weber, Caroline Weinberg, and Amanda Yang.

These are the roles of the National Committee along with their teams:

Committees	Team Leads	Team Members
Co-Chairs	Valorie Aquino, Jonathan Berman, Caroline Weinberg	
Steering	Sofia Ahsanuddin, Rosalyn LaPier, Joanna Spencer-Segal, Lucky Tran	
Logistics and Operations	Kate Gage, Lina Miller	Amanda Yang
Satellite Coordination	Kishore Hari, Caitlin Pharo	Adam Arcus, Jocelyn Barton, Rachael Holloway, Miles Greb, Claudio Paganini, Markus Strehlau, Erin Vaughn, Hugo Valls, Robin Viouroux
Communications	Aaron Huertas	Atu Darko, Paige Knappenberger, Bridget McGann
Social Media	Beka Economopoulos, Courtnie Weber	Thomas Gaudin, Anna Hardin, Karen James, David Lash, Ed Marshall, Carmi Orenstein, Kristina Sullivan
Mission Strategy	Kristen Gunther	Lucky Tran, Beka Economopoulos, Aaron Huertas
Partnerships	Teon L. Brooks, Ayana Elizabeth Johnson	Sofia Ahsanuddin, Kate Gage, Charise Johnson, Mercedes Paredes, and Sabriya Yukes
Fundraising	Julia MacFall	Anthony Burn
Blog	Jennifer Redig	Poornima Apte, Diana Crandall, Manasseh Franklin, Jayde Lovell, and Zoe Wood
Creative/Design	Sloane Henningsen	
Logo Design	Bryan Francis	
Tech	Adam Miller	Sam Kim, Amanda Yang

During the annual meeting of the American Association for the Advancement of Science (AAAS), the largest scientific organization in the US, scientists held the "Rally to Stand Up for Science" at Copley Square, Boston, on February 19. The same month, the AAAS announced its support for the march. By mid-March, some 100 science organizations endorsed the March for Science, including many scientific societies. Endorsers of the march included the American Geophysical Union, American Association of Geographers, American Association of Physical Anthropologists, Society for Neuroscience, Society for Freshwater Science, American Statistical Association, Association for Psychological Science, American Sociological Association, Electrochemical Society, Entomological Society of America, California Academy of Sciences, and the Monterey Bay Aquarium.

The University of Delaware Center for Political Communication conducted a survey of 1,040 members of March for Science Facebook groups or pages from March 31 to April 18 to study their motivations for joining the march. Respondents cited the following as reasons for marching:

Reason	Percent rating "very important"
Encouraging public officials to make policies based on scientific facts and evidence	97%
Opposing political attacks on the integrity of science	93%
Encouraging the public to support science	93%
Protesting cuts to funding for scientific research	90%
Celebrating the value of science and scientists to society	89%
Promoting science education and scientific literacy among the public	86%
Encouraging scientists to engage the public	70%
Encouraging diversity and inclusion in science	68%
To become more involved in politics or policy-making	45%

Before April, enthusiasts found existing knitting patterns for a hat shaped like a brain and proposed it as a symbol of solidarity for the march in analogy with the pussyhat project.

== Participation ==
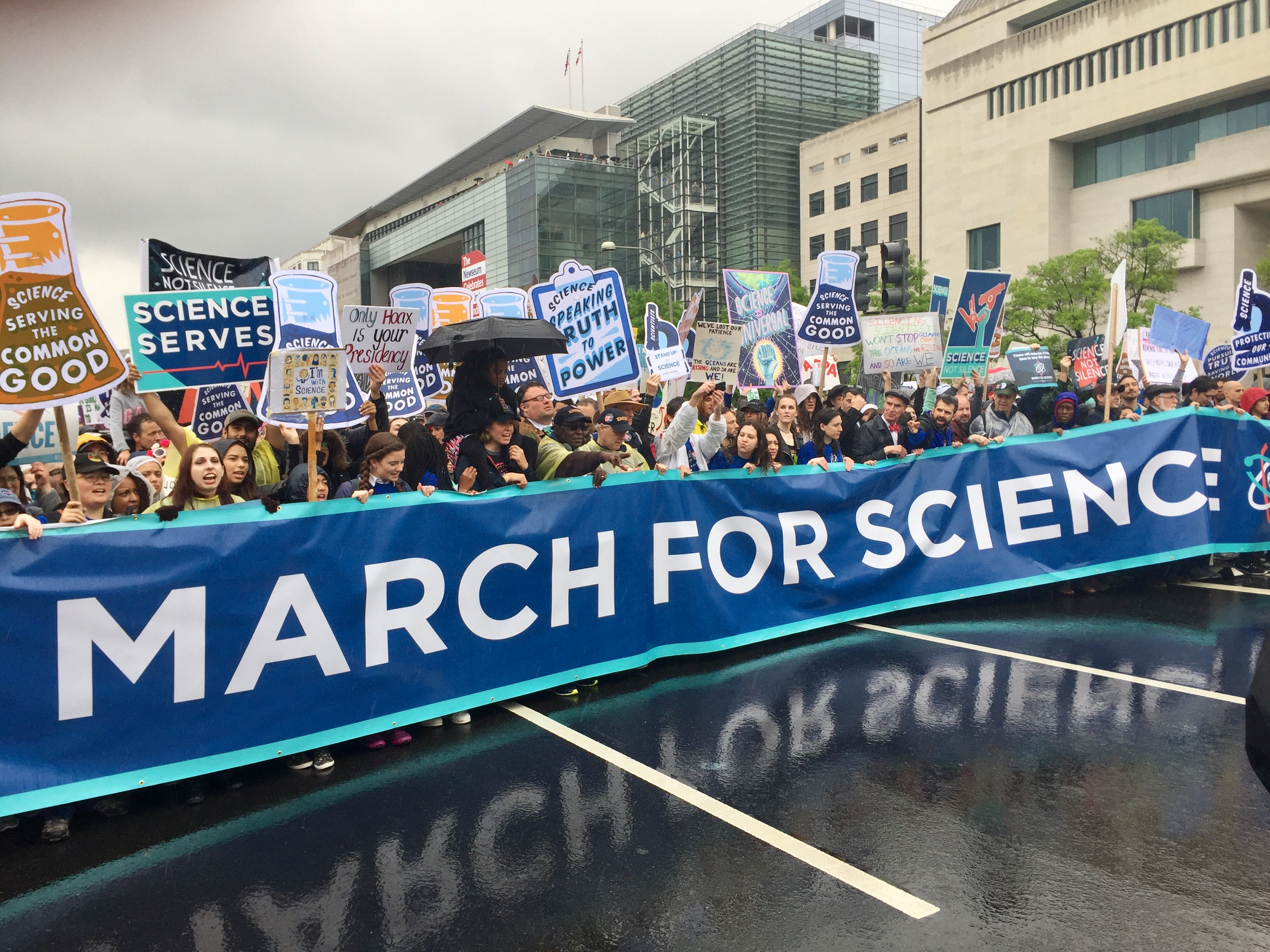
Protesters march towards the Capitol Building.

The primary march, organized by Earth Day Network and March for Science, in Washington, D.C., began at 10 AM with a rally and teach-in on the grounds of the Washington Monument, featuring speeches by concerned citizens alternating with scientists and engineers; including Denis Hayes, co-founder of the first Earth Day in 1970 and Bill Nye. No politicians spoke at the rally. At 2 PM the crowd of thousands, in spite of the steady rain throughout the day, proceeded down Constitution Avenue to 3rd Street, NW between the National Mall and the west front of the United States Capitol.

Protesters gathered in over a hundred cities across the globe, with an estimated 70,000 participants in Boston, Massachusetts, and over 150,000 in several cities in California.

== Reception ==
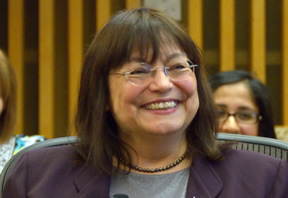
Lydia Villa-Komaroff

Professor Robert Proctor of Stanford University said that the March for Science was similar to other efforts by scientists such as Physicians for Social Responsibility; however, the scale was larger because "there's a broader perception of a massive attack on sacred notions of truth that are sacred to the scientific community."

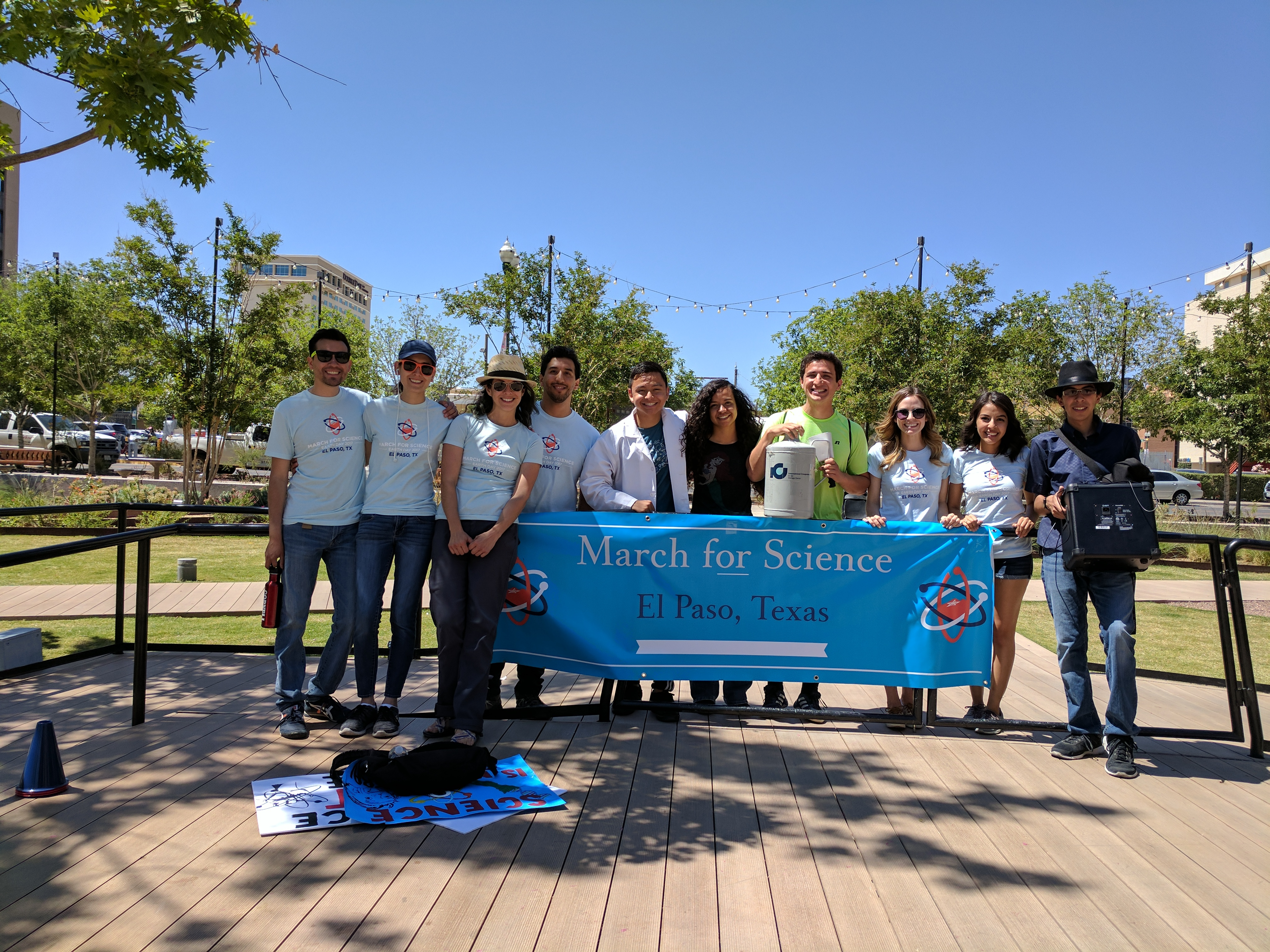
Organizers and some participants of the El Paso March for Science, April 22, 2017

=== Support ===
On January 26, 2017, U.S. Senator Bernie Sanders of Vermont expressed his support for the march, congratulating "those scientists and researchers who are fighting back". U.S. Representative Bill Foster of Illinois, a physicist and the only current member of Congress with a Ph.D. in a natural sciences field, will join the march, "not as a Democratic member of Congress, but as a scientist." Foster said that he viewed the march as political, but not partisan, saying, "if you see a specific policy that is inconsistent with the known principles of science, every citizen who is also a scientist should speak out."

In February the AAAS and other science groups announced their support for the march. Rush Holt Jr., the chief executive officer of the AAAS, expressed support for scientist involvement in politics. Holt also emphasizes the importance of "appreciation for and understanding of science in the general population".

What's so interesting is it's the first time, I think, anybody can point to in decades where there has been a spontaneous effort to defend the idea of science. It's not a march pro or con GMOs or pro or con nuclear power. It's about the value of science and the power of evidence. People are understandably and correctly outraged that in so many areas of public policy ideology is crowding out evidence, that evidence seems to be optional in the fashioning of public policy, and that you have officials using phrases like alternative fact.

— – Rush Holt

=== Criticism ===
The march received a torrent of criticism from conservative publications for the perceived left-wing bias and orientation of the event. Donald Trump's science adviser, climate change denier William Happer stated that "there's no reason to assume the president is against science" and dismissed the march as a cult.

A number of scientists voiced concerns over the march. Theoretical physicist Sylvester James Gates warned that "such a politically charged event might send a message to the public that scientists are driven by ideology more than by evidence". Writing in The New York Times, Robert S. Young argued that the march will "reinforce the narrative from skeptical conservatives that scientists are an interest group and politicize their data, research and findings for their own ends" and that it would be better for scientists to "march into local civic groups, churches, county fairs and, privately, into the offices of elected officials." Matthew Nisbet, writing for Skeptical Inquirer magazine right after the first march in 2017, states that it is not the least educated but the "best educated and most scientifically literate who are prone to biased reasoning and false beliefs about contentious science issues". In his opinion this will mean that the March will only deepen "partisan differences, while jeopardizing trust and impartiality and credibility of scientists". Nisbet feels that confidence in scientists is strong, and they should "use this capital wisely and effectively".

Responding to criticism surrounding the political nature of the march, meteorologist and columnist Eric Holthaus wrote that the scientific field "has always been political" and referred to the example of Galileo Galilei's confrontation with the political order. Holthaus wrote that the scientists must also protest when "truth itself is being called into question".

Discussing science's role in policy and government, Rush Holt points out a fallacy in viewing science and politics as philosophically incompatible: "The ethic in the profession is that you stick to your science, and if you're interested in how science affects public policy or public questions, just let the facts speak for themselves. Of course, there's a fallacy there, too. Facts are, by themselves, voiceless."

San Francisco Lead Organizer Kristen Ratan debated Jerry Coyne on KQED's Forum regarding his criticism of the March and remarked that the millennial generation is just finding its feet with regard to activism and should be encouraged. Ratan also distinguished between being political and being partisan and suggested that while the March for Science is a political act, it is by no means partisan, which implies blind allegiance to one party over another. Ratan reiterated that the March For Science supports evidence-based policy-making regardless of party or affiliation.

== Follow-up ==
Following the march, the organizers of the March for Science encouraged people to a "Week of Action" with an outline of daily actions.

The following spring, Science not Silence: Voices from the March for Science Movement, was published by MIT Press. The book, edited by Stephanie Fine Sasse and Lucky Tran, featured stories and images from marches held around the globe. It was selected as one of the "World's Best Human Rights Books" of Spring 2018 by Hong Kong Free Press.

In July 2018, March for Science created and hosted the SIGNS (Science in Government, Institutions & Society) Summit in Chicago, Illinois. The summit was co-hosted by Field Museum and brought together organizers from satellite marches to connect, strategize, and develop skills to bring back to their communities. The program featured notable figures, including talks by Fabio Rojas, Brian Nord, Adia Benton, and Dana R. Fisher, as well as a poetry reading by Ed Roberson. Many sessions were recorded and are available to view online.

== See also ==
- Climate governance
- Environmental policy of the first Donald Trump administration
- Environmental politics
- Global change
- IPCC Fifth Assessment Report
- Online social movement
- Politicization of science
- Politics of global warming
- Post-truth politics
- The Republican War on Science, 2005 book
