= Christen A. Smith =

Associate professor of anthropology

- Education: Ph.D., Stanford University, M.A., Stanford University, A.B., Princeton University,
- Occupations: Associate professor of anthropology and African and African diaspora studies
- Employer: University of Texas at Austin
- Website: http://www.afro-paradise.com/

Christen A. Smith is an associate professor of anthropology and African and African diaspora studies at Yale University. Previously, she was an associate professor of anthropology and African and African diaspora studies at the University of Texas at Austin, and the director of the university's Center for Women's and Gender Studies, where she played a vital role in the founding of the Department of Women's and Gender's Studies. She is also the founder of Cite Black Women.

Smith researches anti-Black racism with a focus on police-led and state violence, and on the regions of Brazil and the United States. She describes herself as a Black feminist and supports the police abolition movement.

== Education ==
Smith received a Bachelor of Arts degree in anthropology from Princeton University in 1999. She received a Master of Arts in Cultural and Social Anthropology from Stanford University in 2003 and a Doctor of Philosophy in the same field from Stanford University in 2007.

== Afro-Paradise ==
In 2016, Smith published a book through University of Illinois Press titled Afro-Paradise: Blackness, Violence, and Performance in Brazil. She coined the term Afro-Paradise to refer to a society that celebrates Black bodies and consumes Black culture while also sapping Black labor and killing Black people. The term was inspired by time she spent in Salvador, Bahia, with Smith explaining "The state terrorizes its own citizens in order to create the fantasy of Bahia as a celebratory, romantic Black paradise: Afro-Paradise." Bahia is the focus of the book, which is made up of five chapters.

The book was positively reviewed in the Luso-Brazilian Review, which suggested that the reader also research the history of Brazil as it relates to the conflict outlined in Afro-Paradise. Another positive review in Studies in Latin American Popular Culture described the format of the book, which intersperses scenes from a play by a Bahian activist group, as "highly innovative".

== Cite Black Women ==
In 2017, Smith attended a conference at which a presenter paraphrased her book in a PowerPoint presentation and did not cite her. She made a t-shirt with the words "Cite Black Women" and began wearing it to conferences, eventually making more and selling them. She continues to sell the shirts and donate the proceeds. In 2018, she started a podcast with the same name.

== Research ==
Smith researches anti-Black racism with a specific focus on Brazil and the United States and on police-led violence and state violence.
