= Cite Black Women =

Campaign to encourage citation of Black women in academia

- Formation: 2017; 9 years ago
- Founder: Christen A. Smith
- Website: citeblackwomencollective.org

Cite Black Women is a campaign that aims to "rethink the politics of knowledge production" by encouraging the citation of Black women, particularly in academic fields. It was founded in 2017 by Christen A. Smith, an associate professor of African and African diaspora studies and anthropology at the University of Texas at Austin, after a presenter at a conference she attended had plagiarized from a book she had written. Smith made a t-shirt with the words Cite Black Women and began wearing it to conferences, eventually offering the shirts for sale at a meeting of the National Women's Studies Association and selling out of them within 24 hours. Proceeds from the shirts were donated to the Winnie Mandela School in Salvador, Bahia Brazil. In 2018, Smith started a podcast with the same name. As of July 2020, she continued to sell the shirts and donate the proceeds.

== Organization ==
Cite Black Women is both a collective, as well as a hashtag campaign #CiteBlackWomen and #CiteBlackWomen Sunday.

== Goals ==
Cite Black Women has five core resolutions:

1. Read the works of Black women;
2. Integrate Black women into the core of your syllabus (in life and in the classroom);
3. Acknowledge Black women's intellectual production;
4. Make space for Black women to speak;
5. Give Black women the space and time to breathe.

The campaign is intended to address the underrepresentation of Black women in academia.

== See also ==
- Misogynoir
