= Brittany Kamai =

American astronomer

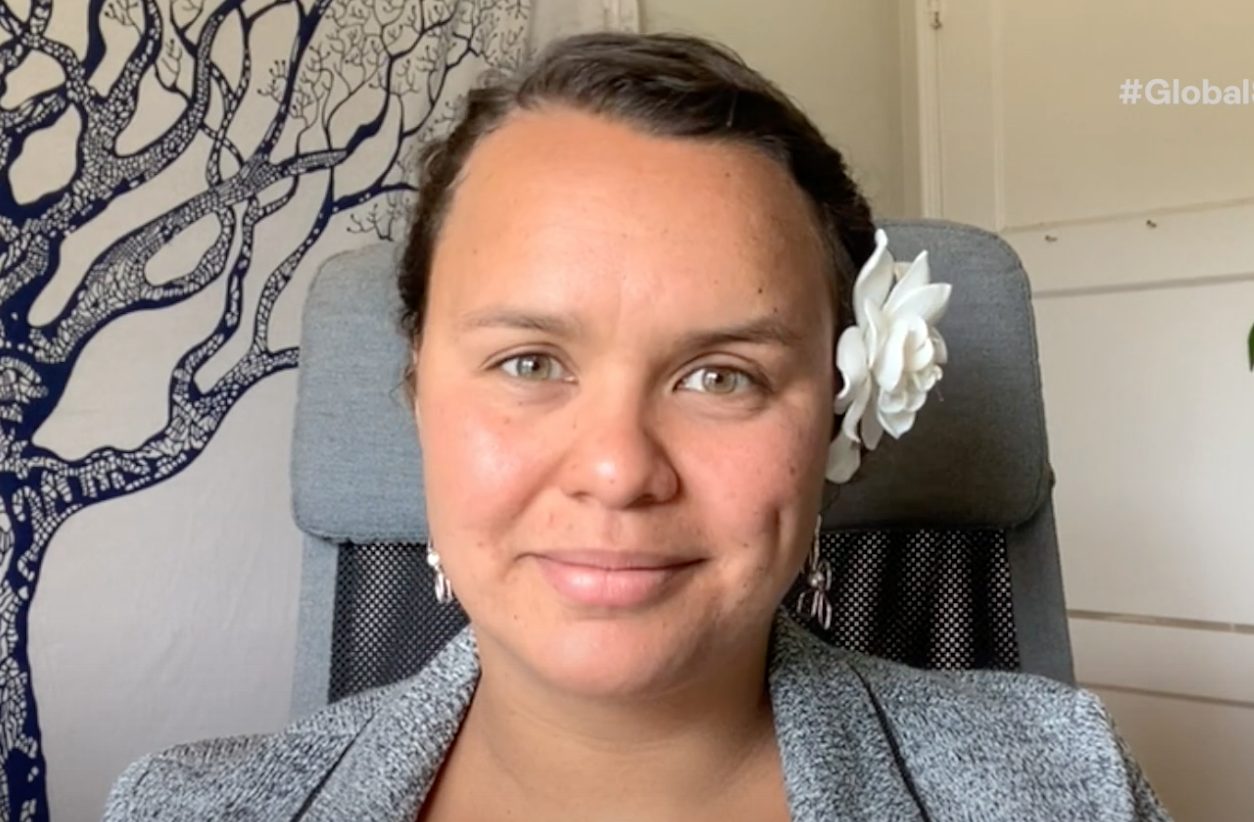
- Kamai on Global Science TV in 2020
- Born: Honolulu
- Education: University of Hawaiʻi at Mānoa; Fisk University; University of Chicago; Vanderbilt University
- Known for: Founder, #ShutDownSTEM
- Scientific career
- Fields: Physics (astrophysics)
- Workplaces: Caltech; University of California, Santa Cruz
- Thesis: "Hunting for MHz Gravitational Waves with the Fermilab Holometer" (2016)
- Doctoral advisor: Andreas A. Berlind (Vanderbilt), Stephan S. Meyer (University of Chicago)

Brittany Lehua Kamai is an American astrophysicist and racial justice activist. Kamai is a postdoctoral fellow at the University of California, Santa Cruz and the California Institute of Technology. She was the founder of #ShutDownSTEM, part of the Strike for Black Lives held on June 10, 2020. A native Hawaiian, Kamai grew up in Honolulu and graduated from President Theodore Roosevelt High School and the University of Hawaiʻi at Mānoa. She completed her Master of Arts from Fisk University and her PhD from Vanderbilt University. Kamai is only the second native Hawaiian to earn a doctorate in astrophysics and the third to earn a PhD in physics.

== Early life and education ==
Kamai grew up in Honolulu, Hawaii and graduated from President Theodore Roosevelt High School. She completed her Bachelor's degree in physics from the University of Hawaiʻi at Mānoa, where she played NCAA Division I water polo, and her Master of Arts at Fisk University in 2011. She attended graduate school at the University of Chicago, where she worked at the Fermilab, and was awarded her PhD in 2016 from Vanderbilt University. Kamai's doctoral research focused on using the Fermilab Holometer to search for gravitational waves in the MHz frequency range.

Kamai is only the second native Hawaiian to earn a doctorate in astrophysics and the third to earn a PhD in physics. She was part of the Fisk-Vanderbilt Master's to PhD Bridge Program and completed a postdoctoral research fellowship through the Astrophysics Future Faculty Launch Program and Vanderbilt University.

== Career ==
As of June 2020, Kamai held joint postdoctoral appointments at the University of California, Santa Cruz and the California Institute of Technology. She is a member of the research group at the Laser Interferometer Gravitational-Wave Observatory and her research focuses on gravitational wave instrumentation. In spring 2024, Kamai was a visiting astronomy professor at the University of Washington, where she taught Pacific Indigenous Astrophysics. This course connected astrophysics with Pacific Indigenous navigation. This course was designed to be accessible for all University of Washington students, meaning that no astronomy or physics background was needed. Kamai shared her wisdom of her ancestors and about modern day concepts of astrophysics so that students could deepen their understanding of the cosmos.

=== #ShutDownSTEM ===
A Native Hawaiian, Kamai identifies as a woman of color, and in 2020, in response to the murder of George Floyd, she helped organize #ShutDownSTEM to Strike for Black Lives. The initiative, held on June 10, called for those working in STEM to suspend work for the day, focusing instead on education and initiatives to combat systemic anti-Black racism in the field. The event drew international support from the scientific community.

== Honours and awards ==
- Heising-Simons Fellowship. jointly appointed at Caltech and University of California, Santa Cruz.
- National Academy of Sciences’ Kavli Frontiers of Science Fellow (2018)
- National Academy of Sciences’ Ford Dissertation Fellowship
