= Brian Nord =

American astrophysicist and machine learning researcher

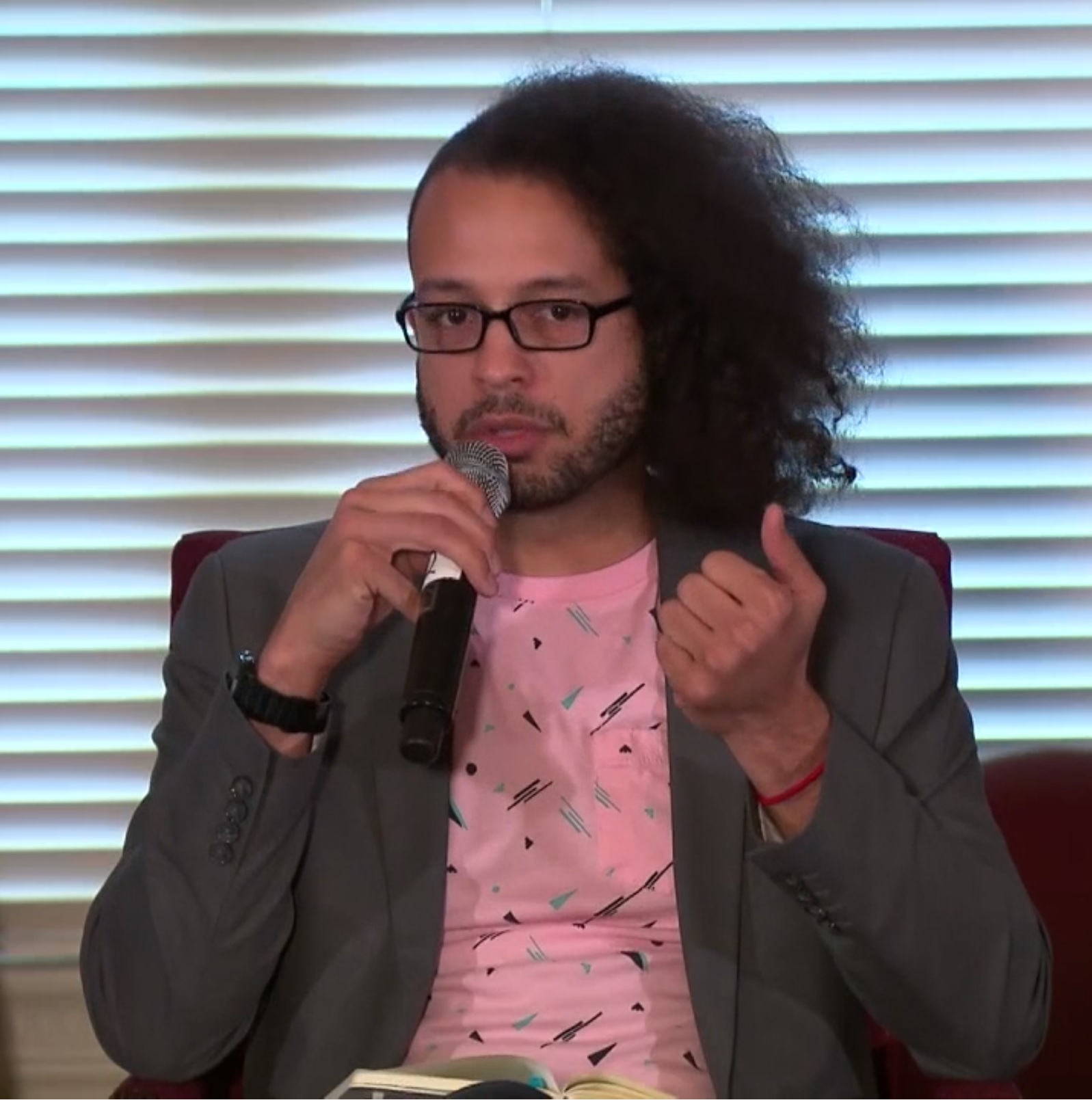
Nord at "Becoming Interplanetary" talk at the Library of Congress in 2018

Brian D. Nord is an American astrophysicist and machine learning researcher at Fermi National Accelerator Laboratory (also known as Fermilab or FNAL).

== Early life and education ==
Nord grew up in Wisconsin. Nord studied physics at the Johns Hopkins University, graduating with a B.A. in physics in 2003, and went on to graduate school at the University of Michigan in Ann Arbor, where he got a PhD in physics. Nord's doctoral dissertation is titled Virtual Sky Surveys and Multi-wavelength Investigations of Galaxy Clusters.

== Career ==
After getting his doctorate, Nord won a National Science Foundation (NSF) Alliance for Graduate Education and the Professoriate (AGEP) Fellowship, and remained at the University of Michigan to continue his research. In 2012, Nord became a postdoctoral associate at Fermilab, and joined the faculty of the University of Chicago in 2017.

Nord is part of Fermilab's Machine Intelligence Group, which works to apply Artificial Intelligence to a diverse set of problems in high energy physics, astrophysics, and cosmology.

Nord's research focuses on a number of areas in cosmology: he studies novel methods for detecting gravitational lenses, as well as cosmological survey simulation and design. Nord's work has been written about extensively in such outlets as The Atlantic, Science, symmetry, and others.

== Public engagement ==
In June 2020, in the wake of the murder of George Floyd, Nord organized a global "Strike for Black Lives" along with Chanda Prescod-Weinstein and the Particles for Justice Group. Nord authored a letter on the Particles for Justice page titled "How Long Should We Wait?" On June 10, the day of the strike, over 4,500 academics pledged participation in the strike. Additionally, numerous organizations including Nature, the American Physical Society, the American Association for the Advancement of Science, and the American Institute of Physics supported and/or participated in the strike.

== Honors and awards ==
- AGEP Postdoctoral Fellowship (2010-2012)
- University of Michigan Rackham Merit Fellowship (2004-2010)
- University of Michigan Marcellus L. Wiedenbeck Teaching Award (2009)
- University of Michigan Jerry Soffen Leadership Award (2004)
- NASA Academy, Goddard Space Flight Center Trustee Scholarship (2000-2003)
- Johns Hopkins University Hess Memorial Scholarship (2000-2003)
