= Africa-America Institute =

International education organization

The Africa-America Institute (AAI) is an international education organization dedicated to advancing the continent's development through higher education and skills training, convening activities, and promoting greater engagement between Africa and the United States.

== History ==
Horace Mann Bond, President of Lincoln University and Professor William Leo Hansberry, of Howard University founded Africa-America Institute in 1953 to provide financial assistance and hospitality to Africans studying in the US. The Central Intelligence Agency was centrally involved in AAI's affairs for nearly a decade, providing the majority of the funds spent by the institute in the period of the mid-1950s and 1962.

As African nations gained independence, AAI offered higher education scholarship programs in the United States to support African scholars in gaining a higher education and skills that could be applied in post-colonial Africa. Its programming expanded to provide academic and professional skills training opportunities for Africans in both the U.S. and Africa in the 1990s. AAI's programs evolved in the early- 2000s to focus on increased U.S.-Africa engagement on issues impacting the African continent with policymakers and business leaders from the U.S. and Africa.

In 2013 the organization celebrated its 60th anniversary in the New York Hilton. The event included a discussion by Hailemariam Desalegn, the Prime Minister of Ethiopia, Hifikepunye Lucas Pohamba, the President of Namibia and Foreign Affairs Ministers of Ghana, Hanna Tetteh and Tanzania as regards Africa's past, present and future. The organization highlighted how more than 23,000 individuals from 54 African countries had been supported by the organization.

== AAI Programs ==
Transformational Leadership Program (TLP)

The Transformational Leadership Program (TLP) is a leadership and management training program for leaders of African civil society organizations and small micro-enterprises (SMEs). TLP educational partners include United States International University (USIU) in Kenya; Pan-Atlantic University in Nigeria; UNISA–The University of South Africa, and University of Stellenbosch Business School (USB) in South Africa.

AAI Future Leaders Legacy Fund

The AAI Future Leaders Legacy Fund provides scholarships for African students to earn bachelor's degrees and vocational and technical training certifications at high performing African institutions. Partner institutions include Ashesi University, Ghana; United States International University (USIU-Africa), Kenya; and UNISA—The University of South Africa.

AAI Speaker Series

The AAI Speaker Series and Conversations on Africa (COA) series in Washington, D.C. offer a platform for thought leaders on U.S.-Africa policy.

EADB Math, Science, Technology and Engineering University Scholarship Program

The East African Development Bank (EADB) scholarship program for experienced teachers and lecturers to earn a post-graduate degree in science, technology, engineering and mathematics (STEM) at Rutgers University and New Jersey Institute of Technology in the United States.

Past AAI Programs

Past programs include: The African Graduate Fellowship Program (AFGRAD), Advanced Training for Leadership and Skills Project (ATLAS), African Scholarship Program of American Universities (ASPAU), International Visitors Program (IVP) and International Fellowship Program (IFP).

== Annual Awards Gala ==
Held annually during the week of the United Nations General Assembly, AAI's Annual Awards Gala brings together African Heads of State and diplomats, business and philanthropic leaders to celebrate African achievement.

== State of Education on Africa Conference ==
AAI's annual State of Education on Africa (SOE) conference is a space for learning and dialogue between students, parents, teachers, leaders, and innovators interested in transforming K–12 education by infusing it with scholarly and unbiased knowledge about Africa and the worldwide Diaspora through effective teaching that supports student academic achievement. The SOE conference provides a platform to discuss and put forth solution on education at levels in Africa.

Previous SOEs were held in New York City in 2014, and in Lagos, Nigeria in 2015. 2021's SOE, "Teaching Africa in the World", explored recovered histories that center the contributions of Africa and its worldwide Diaspora in the making of the modern world. The conference has featured renowned academics such as Dr. Michael A. Gomez, Dr. Pearl T. Robinson, and Dr. Lyra Monteiro.

== Board of trustees ==
=== Current members ===
- Nik Amarteifio
- Ousseina Alidou
- Kofi Appenteng, President and CEO
- Mamadou Beye
- Rebecca Lowell Edwards, Vice Chair
- Michelle Gavin
- Christal Jackson, Chair
- Humble Lukanga
- Bob McCarthy, Vice Chair
- Peter McKillop
- Khumo Shongwe

=== Trustees Emeriti ===
- Peggy Dulany
- Harold K. Hochschild
- Maurice Tempelsman
- Roger Wilkins

=== President Emerita ===
- Mora McLean

=== Past board members ===
Former members are listed with their affiliation at the time of their service.

- Brian Atwood, former Administrator of USAID
- William Asiko, The Coca-Cola Africa Foundation
- Etta M. Barnett, The Links, Inc.
- Alexander Cummings, Coca-Cola Company
- Richard Holbrooke, U.S. diplomat
- Anne Kabagambe, executive director of the World Bank Group's Africa Group 1 Constituency
- Olusegun Obasanjo, former President of Nigeria

== Prominent AAI Alumni ==
- Marian Ewurama Addy, first Ghanaian woman professor of natural science, first host of the National Science and Maths Quiz and recipient of the 1999 UNESCO Kalinga Prize
- Hassana Alidou, Ambassador to the U.S. and Canada, Embassy of the Republic of Niger
- Nik Amarteifio, CEO and Chairman of Equatorial Cross Acquisitions Ltd
- Dr. Thelma Awori, Honorary Consul of Liberia to Uganda and Founding Chair and Co-president Sirleaf Market Women's Fund
- Claude Borna, Director, managing director and Chief Innovation Officer, Sèmè City Development Agency
- Austin H. Demby, Director, PEPFAR, Office of Policy and Program Coordination, Office of the Assistant Secretary for Global Affairs, United States Department of Health and Human Services
- Austin Esogbue, first Black tenured professor at the Georgia Institute of Technology, and the first African to have served on the board of NASA
- H.E. Hage Geingob, President of the Republic of Namibia
- Ablade Glover, Ghanaian artist and academic
- Mohamed Helmy, CEO of District Spaces and Progress
- Dr. Wangari Maathai, Founder of the Green Belt Movement and the 2004 Nobel Peace Prize Laureate
- Strive Masiyiwa, Founder and Executive Chairman, Econet Wireless
- Thandika Mkandawire, Leading economist, academic, and former Chair of African Development at the LSE
- Phumzile Mlambo-Ngcuka, executive director of UN Women
- Ann Therese Ndong-Jatta, Director, Multi-Sectoral Office for East Africa, UNESCO
- Sophia Abdi Noor, Member of Parliament, the Republic of Kenya and Founding Member of Womankind Kenya
- Alassane Ouattara, President of the Republic of Côte d'Ivoire
- Cyril Ramaphosa, President of the Republic of South Africa
- Kandeh Yumkella, Special Representative of the UN Secretary General Ban Ki-moon and CEO of Sustainable Energy for All
