= Alidou =

Alidou is both a surname and a given name. Notable people with the name include:

- Hassana Alidou (born 1963), Nigerien diplomat
- Ousseina Alidou (born 1963), Nigerien academic, twin sister of Hassana
- Alidou Badini, Burkinabé film director
- Alidou Barkire (born 1925), Nigerien politician
