= Feminist interpretations of witch trials in the early modern period =

Various feminist interpretations of witch trials in the early modern period have been made and published throughout the nineteenth and twentieth centuries. These interpretations have evolved with popular feminist ideologies, including those of the first-wave, second-wave feminism, and socialist feminist movements.

== Historical background to feminist interpretations ==
Historical writings from the Early Modern period regarding the witch trials establish a basis for the feminist interpretation of the trials. These texts exemplify the witch stereotype, more specifically the female nature of it, that was integrated into society at the time. Principally, most of the legal authorities prosecuting witchcraft were male-staffed with mostly female being prosecuted. Even with male-dominated crime, women were being prosecuted left and right.

=== The Malleus Maleficarum ===
The Malleus Maleficarum is one of the most well-known treatise on witchcraft, written by the Catholic clergyman Heinrich Kramer, in 1484. The essay is divided into three different sections. The first asserts how to preach about witchcraft and how to frame witchcraft in a religious way. The first sections further explains how witchcraft is either real or not, and makes the conclusion that witch craft must be real due to the Devil being real, linking the two together. The second section includes details about witches specifically, particularly characteristics common in witches, how witchcraft is conducted, as well as who is susceptible to possession. The second sections also explains some remedies that can help to prevent witchcraft. Finally, the text describes how the prosecution of witches should occur. The third sections strictly describes step-by-step how to conduct a witch trial, how to handle accusations, how to interrogate, and charge the accused. Each part is organized by asking questions and then providing an answer. Most of the answers came from religious beliefs. Today, the Malleus Maleficarum is widely referred to as evidence of the misogynistic nature of witch trials. The text shows the power the male audience had over women, and the hopelessness women faced when it came to witch accusations.

The Malleus Maleficarum clearly and repeatedly asserts that women are more likely to participate in witchcraft or “sorcery” due to qualities that all and only women have. Never did during the witchcraft was a man accused or ever held accountable for false accusations. One such passage from the second section, which focuses on describing witches in great detail, offers insight into how the author viewed women:

“There are others who give different reasons for why women are found to be superstitious in larger numbers than men, and they say that there are three reasons. The first is that they are prone to believing and because the demon basically seeks to corrupt the Faith, he assails them in particular. Hence Ecclesiasticus 19[4]: ‘He who quickly believes is fickle in heart and will be made small.’ The second reason in that on account of the tendency of their temperament towards flux they are by nature more easily impressed upon to receive revelations through the impression of the disembodied spirits, and when they use this temperament well, they are very good, but when they use it badly, they are worse. For this reason, is that they have loose tongues and can hardly conceal from their female companions the things that they know through evil art, and since they lack physical strength, they readily seek to avenge themselves through acts of sorcery... Since they are prone to flux, they can more quickly offer children to the demons, as in fact they do.”

This passage from the Malleus Maleficarum declares that women are ultimately more susceptible to possession from demons, as well as more prone to lash out using witchcraft just on the basis of assumed female characteristics, such as “loose tongues” and “lack physical strength”. Because this treatise played such a large role in efforts against witchcraft in the early modern time period, it may be assumed that these attitudes about women were widespread and believed by many people in Europe. Additionally, this writing was published during a time of widespread religious influence, therefore as a religious piece of writing, it might have been accepted more readily. And with men holding more power within religious text, women held no chance not being accused or held a fair trial.

=== Daemonologie ===
King James VI's treatise Daemonologie, written in 1597, compiles James's knowledge and beliefs surrounding witchcraft, as well as his beliefs on his own divine rule. This work, as well as James's participation in the North Berwick Witch Trials of 1590-1592, influenced the witch trials in Scotland, providing a framework for identifying and persecuting witches.

Many of the ideas found in Daemonologie came from James's involvement in the North Berwick Witch Trials, which stemmed from the belief that witches in Denmark and Scotland were attempting to kill James and his new wife. James went to Denmark in 1589 to retrieve his bride, Princess Anne of Denmark, from Norway. The poor weather surrounding the journey was said to be witches attempting to sink the royal ship and kill the king. Jame took an active role in the trials of those accused, as he was a part of both questioning and sentencing for the principal trials.

James's work sought to educate Scotland on the dangers of witchcraft, giving people the tools to identify and persecute a witch. One of such methods included is the Devil's mark, a physical spot believed to be created when a witch sold her soul to the Devil. Locating such a mark was condemning evidence and would make it difficult for a witch to overcome her persecution.

The beliefs contained in Daemonologie influenced Scotland's witch trials throughout James' reign, though his influence began to wane during his rule of England and became minimal after his death in 1625. The work still influenced many beliefs surrounding witchcraft and remains a valuable text in understanding witchcraft in the early modern period.

=== Witches and early modern stereotypes of women ===
The stereotype of witches that existed during the early modern period was derived from historical conceptions of demonism that existed even before the witch trials began. During this era, religious texts were highly believed and were deemed logically. Scholars have cited the belief in female demons in particular as relating directly to the later stereotype of heightened female magic. The first Germanic law codes also referred to the existence of cannibal women who had strikingly similar characteristics as early modern witches. Both were more likely to be female, elderly, poor, isolated from society, or sexually deviant, all of which are characteristics that were outside of the gendered expectations. These particular characteristics as being witch-like can be seen in documentation of trials or records of events of supposed witchcraft. One such record, titled, “The most wonderfull and true storie, of a certaine witch named Alse Gooderige of Stapen hill” from 1597 exemplifies how women were more likely to be accused of witchcraft based on possessing these characteristics. Women were deemed argumentative, troublesome, and aggressive to their neighbours. The document depicts an interaction between Gooderige and a young boy, in which Gooderige is accused of bewitching him. The document includes descriptions of Gooderige as an accused witch, describing her as an elderly widow and having warts on her face. This description reflects the phenomenon that women were more likely to be accused of witchcraft if they deviated from the societal acceptance of being young, beautiful, and involved in society life.

When looking at other interpretations of witches, forms of the arts are how early depictions of literature showcased what a witch would look like. Most of the interpretations of witches came from religious texts. In early modern forms of books, much of what was displayed about witches was because of interest taken in Circe, an enchantress in Greek mythology. Because female nudity could only be depicted in a small and very few contexts, an interest in witchcraft grew. With this in mind (and an interest in the nude female body at the time), witches were depicted as such. Since interest in the nude female body was looked down upon and viewed a sinful, witchcraft from the start with deemed as sinful.

Other mentions of different early interpretations of women occurred when discussing pagan practices and other rituals. Many made mention of pagan festivals in which individuals dressed as women and drank from a type of potion, because of this many early interpretations of witchcraft were stemmed from such practices. As well, Russel Burton, author of Witchcraft in the Middle Ages, makes mention of behavior that was condemned in early Rome, with many believing that women only came to church on Sundays to participate in pagan activities. These included such mundane activities like dancing, singing, etc.

Women who were thought to be involved with witchcraft were often considered to be involved in activities with the Devil, such as acts like sexual intercourse. Most of intercourse or the thoughts of sex was foribbean which further influenced the negative bias towards witchcraft. However, before women were considered to be involving themselves with the Devil himself, many witches were instead thought to be in accordance with the Roman goddess Diana. Diana, the guarantor of fertility, was also the virgin huntress and protector of animals. Even with these factors in mind, though, Diana was thought to be in close accordance with the underworld, where she was identified with Hecate. This darker, more twisted, version of Diana was the early leader of witch craft in the Middle Ages, and was another projection of women during the time period.

When looking at the witch trials themselves, the accused were often female and made up a large chunk of the total witches from early witch trials. Rarely men were accused nor looked at as the main character but more as a victim. Looking more closely at trials in the New England area in particular, Karlson, author of The Devil in the Shape of a Woman , provides multiple sets of data that show different groups involved in the trials. The sex of witches in outbreak witchcraft cases in New England from 1620 to 1725 recorded a whopping 156 accused females, with only 49 males in the list. In New England alone, at least 344 people were accused of witchcraft between the same years listed above in total, making seventy-eight percent of that group women who had been accused of being under suspicion of witchery. Harsher punishments during this time were also exclusively reserved for women of the time. This included such treatments like banishment from society, imprisonment, house arrest, or death (usually sentenced by hanging).

== First and second wave ==
One of the earliest individuals to present a feminist interpretation of the witch trials was the American Matilda Joslyn Gage, a writer who was deeply involved in the first-wave feminist movement for women's suffrage. In 1893, she published the book Woman, Church and State, in which Gage argued that the witches persecuted in the Early Modern period were pagan priestesses adhering to an ancient religion venerating a Great Goddess. However, she repeated the erroneous statement, taken from the works of several German authors, that nine million people had been killed in the witch hunt.

In 1973, two American second-wave feminists, Barbara Ehrenreich and Deirdre English, published an extended pamphlet in which they asserted that the women persecuted had been the traditional healers and midwives of the community who were being deliberately eliminated by the male medical establishment. This theory is questionable, as the majority of those persecuted were neither healers nor midwives. Although they had initially self-published the work, they received such a positive response that the Feminist Press took over publication, and the work then began worldwide distribution, being translated into French, Spanish, German, Hebrew, Danish and Japanese. An updated edition of Ehrenreich and English's publication was re-printed in 2010.

Other feminist historians have rejected this interpretation of events. Historian Diane Purkiss described it as "not politically helpful" because it constantly portrays women as "helpless victims of patriarchy" and thus does not aid them in contemporary feminist struggles.

== Other interpretations ==
Modern scholar Edward Bever theorizes that the high rate of female accusers and accused could have derived from the widespread misogyny of the time. He emphasizes the fact that participation in patriarchal society is not exclusive to men and patriarchal and misogynistic values can permeate a whole society, including women. Europe in the early modern period had rigid gender expectations and those who did not align with those expectations could suffer consequences. For example, it has been suggested that there is a possibility that women who were accused of witchcraft were those who stepped outside of the gender roles assigned to them in their society, such as women who were overtly sexual. These societal expectations of women as well as the stereotype of witches that existed at the time may have contributed to the high number of women accused. Even women who lived within the permitted gender roles of the time might have lived in fear of being accused, prompting them to make false accusations before someone could accuse them. These attitudes about gender may be an explanation for why some areas experienced higher numbers of males accused, such as at the margins of Europe, in Normandy, Iceland, Finland, Estonia, and Russia. If these same beliefs about gender did not permeate these areas, then it makes sense that there would be less of a connection between gender and the accusations of witchcraft.

== Silvia Federici ==
Silvia Federici offers materialist feminist insight into the witch hunt process in her book Caliban and the Witch: Women, the Body and Primitive Accumulation, published in 2004. Her book investigates the transition phase to capitalism, and brings evidence that the process happened in parallel with the Inclosure Acts which deprived women of economic autonomy by retrieving access to commons lands in the transition to a capitalist economy. Federici also comments on the developing sexual division of labor at the time, due to rising capitalism, and how this impacted stress for women.

=== Caliban and The Witch ===
In her book Caliban and the Witch (2004), Silvia Federici argues that the witch-hunts were historical events through which occurred the transformation of women's bodies into “work machines” for the reproduction of the workforce, a necessary precondition of a shift from the subsistence to the monetary economy. She remarks that the period the witch-hunts happened in the world history took place at the same time with the conquest of America, beginning of the slave trade, and expropriation of the peasantry; which all indicate the rise of capitalism. In her view, the witch-hunt was the forgotten piece of the historical puzzle of the emergence of capitalism.

==== Theoretical background ====
As opposed to Marx's claim, according to Federici, the historical shift from a subsistence economy (production-for-use) to a capitalism (production-for-profit) has not caused a liberation of the working class from scarcity and necessity, but the other way around, the economy has become subject to wage labor exploitation, unpaid work of women, and degradation of environmental nature. Because the burden of the structural change in economic relations and the production with enclosures in the first phase of capitalist development had stood mostly by women, they were the ones who tried to save their lands, social position, and subsistence-oriented agriculture practices. However, governments in Europe, by passing a law that introduced a new crime, i.e. the accusation of witchcraft —a crimen exceptum equal to high treason— they attempted to silence the resistance of women and any other alternative solutions to feudalism other than capitalism. Besides, it allowed primitive accumulation by taking the capacities available for social production as granted, and treated them as free and infinitely available gifts, in the same way how the capitalist system would treat nature.

Federici has expanded the Marxist analysis of the birth of capitalism by including the change in the social position of women and the production of labor-power. The stress is given to the fact that the division of labor is highly gendered. The new sexual division of labor has developed itself with subjugating women's labor, and women's reproductive function to produce labor-force; the undervaluation and subordination of women by excluding them from waged work; and in association with the mechanization of workforce, women's body has also been started to perceived as machines to produce new workers. Federici and many scholars argue that the sexual division of labor with the control of women's body is the precondition to produce the surplus value. The social reproductive theory mainly argues that capitalism exploits women's labor outside the workplace through their invisible, flexible, and unpaid labor.

Besides the structural changes in the spheres of reproduction and in the terrain of the relation between men and women, Federici argues that the shift coming with all the means and tools of capital accumulation was an attract to communal mutual aid. Being midwives, their capabilities of healing practices to cure people with herbs and their knowledge of the properties of plants and roots had given them a position in society. With infra-politics of capitalism, the attack on the healer resulted in that the communal production and survival skills were taken away from the society, which had changed the structure of mutual aid, if not eliminated it completely.

The second scholar which Silvia Federici criticizes is Michel Foucault, and she does this through three points. First, before Michel Foucault, feminist activists and theorists understanding of the body were taken as the substantial factor since the early 1970s to analyze the positions of male and female in society avant la lettre. Second, Michel Foucault argues that in modern society, physical violence has declined, and given its place to Psychological abuse. By beginning her analysis from [witch-hunts] and giving contemporary examples, she has put emphasis on ongoing violence against women with colonial means of domination of men, which is omitted in Michel Foucault's analysis. Third, she criticizes him for writing the “History of Sexuality” (1978) from a “universal, abstract, asexual subject” which enabled him to completely omit a historical event of gendered violence as big as the witch-hunt.

==== Historical background ====
After the Black Death (1347-1351) drastically reduced the working population in Europe, it was increasingly difficult for feudal lords to control and discipline the peasants. Because of the scarcity of peasants capable of work, the ones who did work developed strategies against the corrupted lords such as leaving the harvest to rot or simply not finishing the work. This was possible due to the subsistence economy in which the work was being paid for with products and the right to work on the land, not with money like in the monetary economy. They grew their own food and were not dependent on money for buying basic materials. It was also a solidarity economy in which women would share labor, such as care work, in between themselves, parallel to sharing work with men, such as working in the field. This division was a source of emancipation rather than the opposite because it enabled them to have autonomy over their work, as well as over their bodies. Women played a big political role in these societies. When the monetary economy was introduced, only men were entitled to receive payment, after which began the marginalization of women's labor from the economical and political realms of the society.

The majority of witch hunts occurred between 1500 and 1650, with a peak around the 1620, according to Federici. It was the time when the ideology of Mercantilism shaped the perceptions of European elites. Having a big labor force was a necessary precondition to having a successful economy. In the context of the aftermath of the Black Death, the question of population control was obvious to them, so began the “demographic recording, census-taking, and the formalization of demography itself as the first ‘state science’”. Finding a way of systematically increasing the size of the labor force was an important political goal for the ruling class and the nascent bourgeoisie.

The way to systematically increase the size of the labor force was to gain control over the reproduction of society. Women were through this lens seen only as wombs that produce children who will enter the labor force. To gain this control the states used “multi-media propaganda to generate a mass psychosis among the population.” . This propaganda machine included names such as Thomas Hobbes and Jean Bodin, but also many other government officials who traveled the countries and spread the propaganda about witches. The state also used the policing apparatus and methods created by the Inquisition in the previous centuries. They successfully sowed distrust which disintegrated small societies. Their main target was lower-class women which nevertheless had knowledges that were of crucial importance for the autonomy and integrity of their societies. Knowledge such as healing, birth control, and midwifery came in direct opposition to the state interests and the new mechanical paradigm. Many of these women were hunted down, put through unfair trials, and brutally murdered.

One of the ways to gain control over the reproductive force of the population was to put the practices of midwifery under a strict state control. Many of the witches were also midwives or “wise women”, and traditionally the practices of midwifery and obstetrics were exclusive to women until the 16th and 17th century. In the 16th century there was a new precondition to being a midwife — the woman had to demonstrate beforehand that she was a “good Catholic”. In the 17th century there began to appear the first male midwives and “within a century, obstetrics has come almost entirely under state control.”

Under this interpretation, the witch trials in Europe would have been of a political background, rather than strictly gender- focused outlook, religious or otherwise. However, even this explanation for the widespread trials reflects a misogynistic and female-controlling frame of mind.

== See also ==
- Witchcraft
- Witchcraft (feminist)
- Witchcraft, Feminism, and Media
- Goddess movement
- Catharism - Role of Women and Gender
