= Uganda and the World Bank =

Uganda joined the World Bank on September 27, 1963, along with the IBRD, IDA and IFC. It later joined the ICSID on October 14, 1966, and the MIGA on June 10, 1992. Uganda also holds the chair for the 22 nation Africa Group 1 Constituency, headed by Anne Kabagambe. Uganda holds 0.07% of the vote in the IBRD while its constituency holds 1.92%. In the IFC, Uganda holds 0.05% of the vote while its constituency holds 1.31%. Uganda in the IDA holds 0.18% of the vote, while the Africa Group 1 Constituency commands 4%. In the MIGA, meanwhile, Uganda has 0.21% while its constituency holds 3.54% of the vote.

As of 2019, Uganda's economy experienced a slight rebound after a five-year slow down, giving rise to a feeling of optimism. However, economic growth remained heavily intertwined with agriculture and natural events, as well as favorable trade conditions going forward. Regional instability among Uganda's top trading partners combined with a 1.2 million refugee population had also placed strains on Uganda's economy. Additionally, despite passing its Millennium Development Goal of halving poverty, preventing those who have escaped poverty from sliding back in has proven difficult. The main World Bank projects are involved in infrastructure and education in order reduce poverty in the country, with eleven projects currently underway.

== Development Emphasis - Infrastructure and Education ==
World Bank initiatives have been focused on reducing poverty through infrastructure development and education. This has included road development, internet accessibility, water management, and nutrition and business education. Education in particular is important, since the average years of education for a Ugandan at age 18 are 7 years, yet regionally it is 8.1. Furthermore, the actual amount learned during these years is questionable and is reduced to 4.5 years of “actual” learning. The Ugandan budget for education is also much lower than others in its region at only 2.6% of GDP.

=== Infrastructure Development ===
Infrastructure development is a major part of World Bank aid to Uganda and generally involve urbanizing and transportation objectives. One such project is the Uganda Support for Municipal Development Project (USMID), which is a US$150 million IDA led project that began in 2013 with potential plans to expand since 2018. The project was conceived in order to facilitate urban infrastructure development by lending money for the development of fourteen municipalities, where each of these municipalities has considerable autonomy in choosing what kinds of infrastructure programs best suit them. The project is also part of Programs-for-Results, which seeks to deliver aid based on improvement results. On April 19, 2018, the IDA proposed increasing the amount by an additional US$335 million with the intention of increasing the geographical range of the program to eight more municipalities while increasing the depth of the program in existing ones. It is also designed to help alleviate problems associated with refugee influxes and rapid urbanization in Uganda.

Other examples of large infrastructure development projects include the North Eastern Road-Corridor Asset Management Project (NERAMP), which is designed to increase the efficiency, oversight and quality of road building in the north. There is also the Water Development program which is supposed to help integrate water planning and sanitation services.

=== Education Development ===
Education in Uganda remains a pressing concern for development goals. Education is currently characterized by teacher and student absenteeism, lack of resources, as well as low government spending. According to the UN, Uganda is also home to the third largest refugee population in the world, adding additional stress to its economy and increasing demand for education. Several World Bank projects are designed to help with this, including the Uganda Multi-Sectoral Food Security and Nutrition Project and the Uganda Skills Development Project. The Uganda Multi-Sectoral Food Security and Nutrition Project seeks to educate people about micro-nutrient rich eating and gardening techniques, as well as holding various workshops demonstrating healthy food habits. Meanwhile, the Uganda Skills Development Project is a multi-objective program designed broadly to improve worker skills, fill the needs of the economy, and provide regulation for other training services.

== Active World Bank Projects in Uganda ==
Projects
| Project Name | Start date | Commitment Amount |
| Civil works on the 92-km long Vurra-Arua-Koboko-Oraba Road | December 1, 2009 | N/A |
| North Eastern Road-Corridor Asset Management Project (NERAMP) | April 30, 2014 | $243.8 million USD |
| Regional Communications Infrastructure Program (RCIP) | May 22, 2015 | $75 million USD |
| Uganda Support for Municipal Development Project (USMID) | March 28, 2013 | $150 million USD |
| Water Development Project | June 26, 2012 | $135 million USD |
| Uganda Skills Development Project | April 22, 2015 | $100 million USD |
| Health Systems Strengthening Project | May 25, 2010 | $130 million USD |
| Reproductive Health Voucher Project | October 3, 2014 | $0.00 million USD |
| Northern Uganda Social Action Fund | May 27, 2015 | $130 million USD |
| Uganda Multi-Sectoral Food Security and Nutrition Project | January 7, 2015 | $0.00 million USD |
| Competitiveness and Enterprise Development Project (CEDP) | May 9, 2013 | $100 million USD |
