= Kabagambe =

Kabagambe is a surname prevalent in Uganda. It may refer to:

- Anne Kabagambe, Ugandan international development and finance executive
- Joseph Kabagambe (born 1984), Ugandan footballer
- Moïse Mugenyi Kabagambe, Congolese immigrant in Brazil
