= List of ambassadors of Niger to the United States =

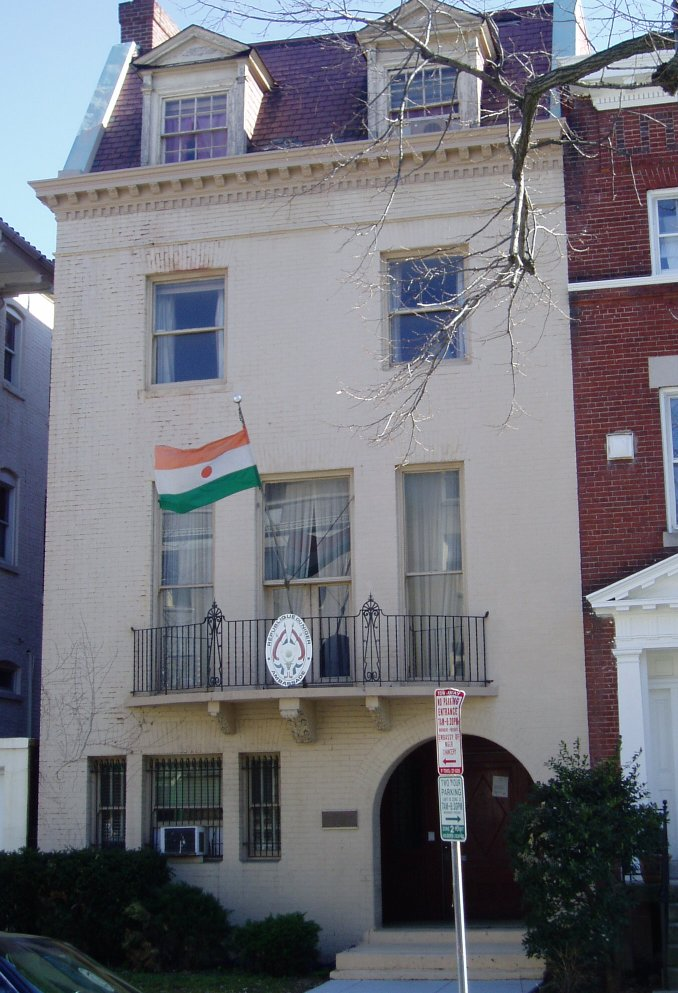
Embassy of Niger to the United States in Washington D.C.

This is a list of ambassadors of The Republic of Niger to the United States can be found in the U.S. Department of State's Office of the Chief of Protocol records.

The Republic of Niger first established diplomatic relations with the United States of America upon the African nation's independence in 1960, and the Nigerien Embassy has operated since its formal opening on April 17, 1961. Relations between the United States and Niger have been continuous since that time, although there have been periods of tension following military coups in 1996 and 1999.

The Embassy of Niger in Washington, D.C. is located in Washington, D.C. The Ambassador in Washington, D.C. is accredited regularly with the governments in Buenos Aires, Brasília and Seoul.

== Ambassadors ==
- Issoufou Saidou-Djermakoye
  - Title: Ambassador Extraordinary and Plenipotentiary
  - Appointed:March 16, 1961
  - Presented credentials:April 17, 1961
- Abdou Sidikou
  - Title: Ambassador Extraordinary and Plenipotentiary
  - Appointed:October 26, 1962
  - Presented credentials:December 4, 1962
- Ary Tanimoune
  - Title: Ambassador Extraordinary and Plenipotentiary
  - Appointed:January 8, 1965
  - Presented credentials:January 14, 1965
- Adamou Mayaki
  - Title: Ambassador Extraordinary and Plenipotentiary
  - Appointed:January 26, 1966
  - Presented credentials:February 1, 1966
- Georges Mahaman Condat
  - Title: Ambassador Extraordinary and Plenipotentiary
  - Appointed: July 1, 1970
  - Presented credentials:July 21, 1970
- Monique Hadiza
  - Title: Chargé d'affaires a.i.
  - Appointed: January 1, 1972
- Oumarou G. Youssoufou
  - Title: Chargé d'affaires a.i.
  - Appointed: March 6, 1972
- Abdoulaye Diallo
  - Title: Ambassador Extraordinary and Plenipotentiary
  - Appointed:September 29, 1972
  - Presented credentials:October 2, 1972
- Moussa Dourfaye
  - Title: First Secretary,
  - Appointed:August 9, 1974
- Ilia Salifou
  - Title: Ambassador Extraordinary and Plenipotentiary
  - Appointed:September 3, 1974
  - Presented credentials: October 4, 1974
- Andre Joseph Wright
  - Title: Ambassador Extraordinary and Plenipotentiary
  - Appointed:September 2, 1976
  - Presented credentials:November 18, 1976
- Joseph Diatta
  - Title: Ambassador Extraordinary and Plenipotentiary
  - Appointed: November 18, 1982
  - Presented credentials: November 22, 1982
- Moumouni Adamou Djermakoye
  - Title: Ambassador Extraordinary and Plenipotentiary
  - Appointed:July 7, 1988
  - Presented credentials: September 19, 1988
- Adamou Seydou
  - Title: Ambassador Extraordinary and Plenipotentiary
  - Appointed: September 1, 1992
  - Presented credentials: November 18, 1992
- Joseph Diatta
  - Title: Ambassador Extraordinary and Plenipotentiary
  - Appointed: May 12, 1997
  - Presented credentials: May 14, 1997
- Hassana Alidou
  - Title: Ambassador Extraordinary and Plenipotentiary
  - Appointed: N/A
  - Presented credentials: February 23, 2015
- Abdallah Wafy
  - Title: Ambassador Extraordinary and Plenipotentiary

== See also ==
- Diplomatic missions of Nigeria
- Niger–United States relations
- United States Ambassador to Niger
- Foreign relations of Niger
