= Embassy of the United States, Niamey =

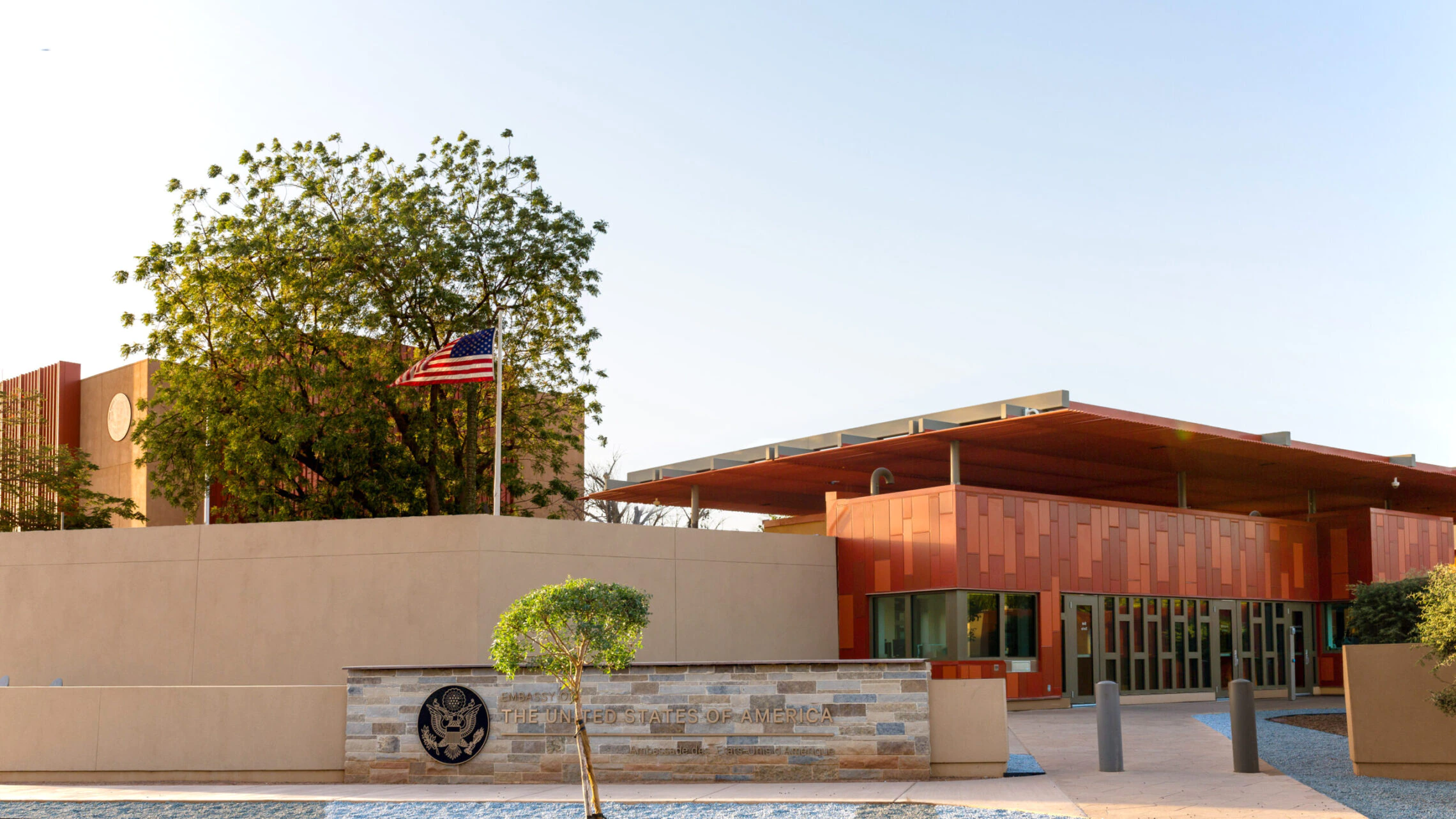
- Location: Niamey, Niger
- Address: BP 11201 Niamey, Niger
- Coordinates: 13°31′34″N 2°4′23″E
- Website: https://ne.usembassy.gov

The embassy of the United States in Niamey is the diplomatic mission of the United States in Niger. The Peace Corps program, which began in 1962 and has had approximately 1185 volunteers serving in the country, and was suspended in 2011. The USAID does not have a Mission in Niger, but there is about $30 million in annual official aid administered through American and local non-governmental organizations.

== History ==
On August 3, 1960, the U.S. formally recognized the Republic of Niger shortly after the country gained independence from France. The embassy was established the same day, when Donald R. Norland presented his credentials as Chargé d'Affaires ad interim. The embassy began operating on February 3, 1961, with Joseph W. Schutz as Chargé d'Affaires ad interim.

Following the 2010 Nigerien coup d'état, Niger returned to constitutional civilian rule with the inauguration of a new president in 2011.

In August 2023, the U.S. reduced embassy staff in the midst of the 2023 Nigerien crisis. This occurred days after the French embassy in Niamey had been attacked.

== See also ==
- Embassy of Niger, Washington, D.C.
- List of ambassadors of the United States to Niger
- Niger–United States relations
