= Autonomedia =

Publisher of radical theoretical works

- Founded: 1984
- Founder: Jim Fleming
- Country of origin: United States
- Headquarters location: Williamsburg, Brooklyn, New York City
- Distribution: AK Distribution, Small Press Distribution (US); Turnaround Publisher Services (UK)
- Publication types: Books
- Official website: autonomedia.org

Autonomedia is a nonprofit publisher based in Williamsburg, Brooklyn known for publishing works of criticism. It is headed by its founder, New York based editor, publisher, and designer, Jim Fleming. It was founded in 1984.

As of the mid-2000s, they were staffed by volunteers and had published over 200 books, usually with 3,000 of each run, and its best known book was Hakim Bey's essays on autonomy, Temporary Autonomous Zone. When Bey died in 2022, it was still one of the publisher's bestsellers, with sales of over 50,000.

Among Autonomedia's other most iconic publications have been Caliban and the Witch (2004) by the Italian scholar and Marxist Feminist activist Silvia Federici and "Black Mystery School Pianists and Other Writings" (2025) by the jazz pianist Matthew Shipp.

Circa 1982, Autonomedia became the parent publisher for Semiotext(e), an imprint known for publishing translations of French post-structuralist literature.

== Authors of note ==
- Peter Lamborn Wilson
- Silvia Federici
- Thom Metzger
- Richard Kostelanetz
- Bob Black
- Matthew Shipp
