= Ousseina Alidou =

Nigerien linguist

- Born: March 29, 1963 (age 62); Niamey, Niger
- Citizenship: Niger
- Education: Master's degree
- Occupation: Professor

Ousseina D. Alidou is distinguished professor of humane letters, School of Arts and Sciences-Rutgers University. She teaches in the Department of African, Middle Eastern and South Asian Languages and Literature at Rutgers University. She received a Master of Arts degree in linguistics at the Université Abdou Moumouni in Niamey, Niger, and a MA degree in applied linguistics at Indiana University Bloomington where she also obtained a theoretical linguistics PhD. She was a member of the Committee for Academic Freedom in Africa and the 2022 president of the African Studies Association.

Her twin sister Hassana Alidou was Niger's ambassador to the United States from 2015 to 2019.

== Early life and education ==
She was born on March 29, 1963, in Niamey, Niger. Following the death of her parents during her childhood, she was raised by her grandmother . She pursued higher education at the Université Abdou Moumouni in Niamey, earning a Master's degree in linguistics in 1988.

In 1988, Alidou moved to the United States, where she earned both a Master's in applied linguistics and a Ph.D. in theoretical linguistics from Indiana University Bloomington, completing her doctorate in 1997.

== Academic and leadership career ==
Alidou began teaching in the U.S. during the early 1990s, with appointments at Indiana University Bloomington, followed by roles as a visiting instructor at Université Abdou Moumouni, and as a lecturer at Ohio State University and the University of Illinois at Urbana–Champaign. She later joined Rutgers University, where she became distinguished professor in the Department of African, Middle Eastern, and South Asian Languages and Literatures.

== Awards ==
- 2006 Rutgers University Board of Trustees Fellowship for Scholarly Excellence
- 2007 Runner-up, Aidoo-Snyder Book Prize, Women's Caucus of the African Studies Association for Engaging Modernity
- 2010 Distinguished Alumni Award of the Africa-America Institute
- 2015 Carnegie African Diaspora Fellowship Award

== Publications ==
Alidou published many scholarly articles and books, including:

- A Thousand Flowers: Social struggles against structural adjustment in African universities, co-edited with Silvia Federici and George Caffentzis, Trenton, NJ: Africa World Press, 2000
- Engaging Modernity: Muslim Women and the Politics of Agency in Postcolonial Niger, Madison: University of Wisconsin Press, 2005.
- Muslim Women in Postcolonial Kenya: Leadership, Representation, and Social Change, Madison: University of Wisconsin Press, 2013.
- Protest Arts, Gender, and Social Change: Fiction, Popular Songs, and the Media in Hausa Society across Borders, University of Michigan Press, 2024.
