= Leila Zerrougui =

Algerian legal expert (born 1956)

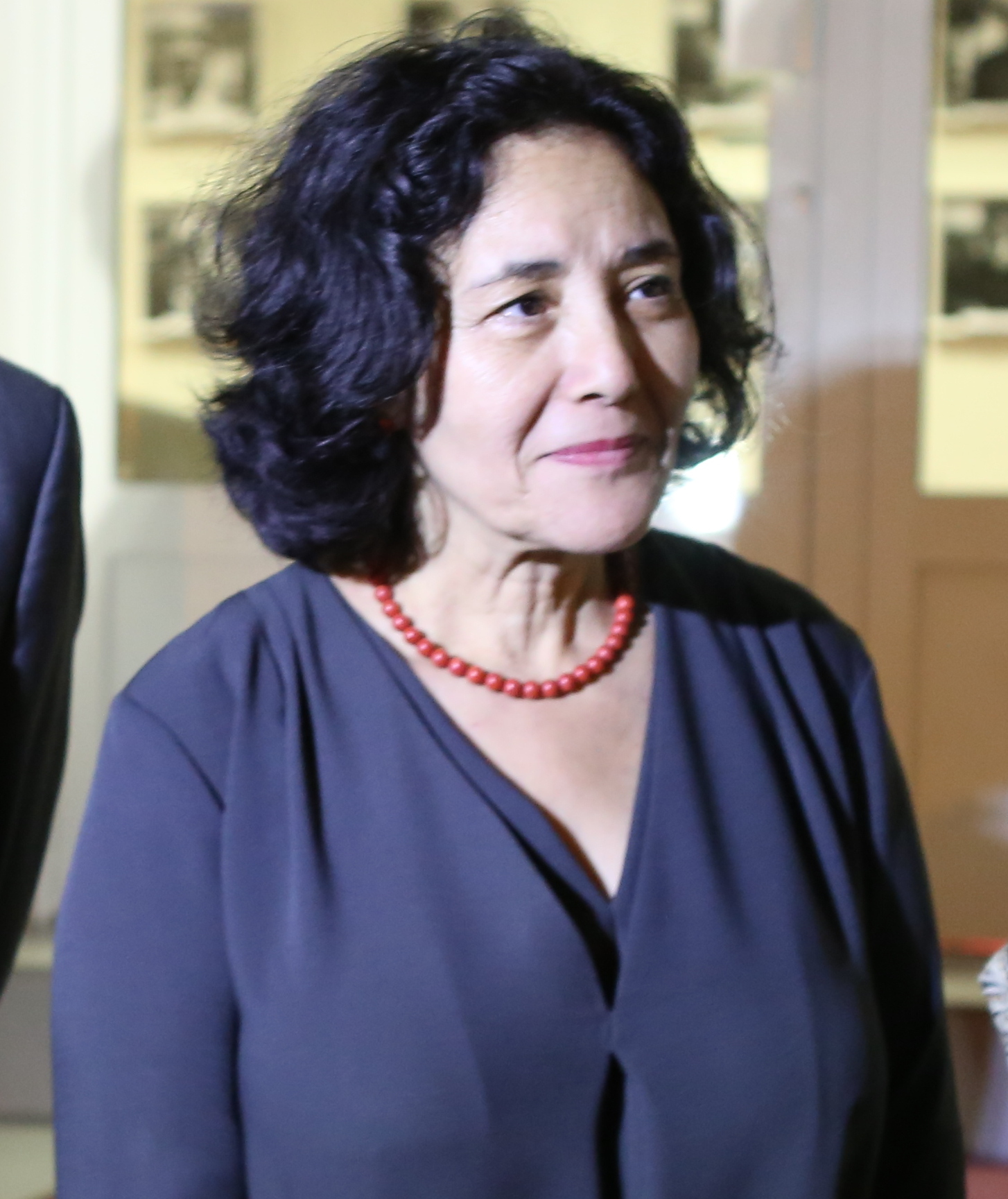
- Leila speaking to the media in Kinshasa
- Born: 1956 (age 69–70); Souk Ahras, Algeria
- Occupations: Legal expert on Human Rights and Administration of Justice; Head of MONUSCO in Democratic Republic of Congo
- Successor: Bintou Keita

Leila Zerrougui (born 1956) is an Algerian legal expert on human rights and administration of justice. She has served as the Special Representative of the UN Secretary-General and Head of the United Nations Stabilization Mission in the Democratic Republic of the Congo (MONUSCO) since January 2018.

== Early life and education ==
Zerrougui was born in Souk Ahras. She graduated from L'Ecole Nationale d'Administration (Algiers) in 1980. Since 1993, she has held various academic positions at law schools in Algeria, and was associate professor of L'Ecole Supérieure de la Magistrature (Algiers). She has published extensively on the administration of justice and human rights.

== Career ==
She was Special Representative of the Secretary-General for Children and Armed Conflict from September 2012 to May 2017. In this capacity, she served as an independent advocate to build awareness and give prominence to the rights and protection of boys and girls affected by armed conflict.

She was a member of the Working Group on Arbitrary Detention under the United Nations Human Rights Council from 2001, and served as the Working Group's Chairperson-Rapporteur from 2003 until May 2008. Prior to this, she had a long career in the Algerian judiciary and, in 2000, was appointed to the Algerian Supreme Court.

She served as a juvenile judge and judge of first instance from 1980 to 1986, and as an appeals court judge from 1986 to 1997. From 1998 to 2000, she served as legal adviser to the Cabinet of the Ministry of Justice and, from 2000 to 2008, as legal adviser to the cabinet of the President of Algeria. She also worked in various positions within the Algerian government and was a member of the Algerian National Commission on the Reform of the Judiciary.

Prior to her appointment as Special Representative in 2012, she was Deputy Special Representative of the Secretary-General and Deputy Head of the United Nations Stabilization Mission in the Democratic Republic of the Congo (MONUSCO) where, since 2008, she spearheaded the mission's efforts in strengthening the rule of law and protection of civilians. In 2013 she was succeeded by Abdallah Wafy.

She was succeeded by Bintou Keita as head of MONUSCO in 2021.
