= Committee for Academic Freedom in Africa =

The Committee for Academic Freedom in Africa (CAFA) was an organisation set up in light of the struggles in the universities consequent to the implementation of the Structural Adjustment Programme (SAP).

The organisation was founded by Silvia Federici and George Caffentzis in the 1980s. They took on the role of coordinators and produced their first newsletter in spring 1991. They were later joined by Ousseina Alidou, Alamin Mazrui, Andrew Nash and Nigel Gibson.

CAFA was involved in the publication of A Thousand Flowers which chronicles this struggle through the 1980s and 1990s.

== Sponsors ==
Alongside Caffentzis and Frederici, an initial list of sponsors was published in issue 2 of the newsletter, with additional sponsors added later:

- Dennis Brutus
- Harry Cleaver
- Peter Linebaugh
- Manning Marable
- Nancy Murray
- Marcus Rediker
- Gayatri Spivak
- Immanuel Wallerstein

From fall 1992:

- Julius Ihonvbere

From spring 1993:

- Horace Campbell

From fall 1993

- Jon Kraus:

From spring 1994:

- Alamin Mazrui
- Lupenga Mphande

From spring 1996:

- Emmanuel Eze

From spring 1997:

- Mario Fenyo

From fall 1997:

- Cheryl Mwaria
