= Nigel Gibson =

British activist

Nigel Gibson is an activist-intellectual, a scholar specialising in philosophy and author whose work has focussed, in particular, on Frantz Fanon. Edward Said described Gibson's work as "rigorous and subtle". He has been described as a leading figure in Fanon scholarship.

== Biography ==
Gibson was born in London, graduated from Aberystwyth University, and was an active militant in the 1984–1985 Miners' Strike. While in London he met South African exiles from the Black Consciousness Movement and, in conversation with the exiles, developed academic work on the movement. He later moved to the United States where he worked with Raya Dunayevskaya in the Marxist Humanism movement, studied with Raymond Geuss and Edward Said and became an important theorist of Frantz Fanon on whom he has written extensively. Gibson endorsed the statement in support of the South African shack dweller organization, Abahlali baseMjondolo, against state violence.

== Books ==
Gibson has co-edited a collection of work on Theodor Adorno with Andrew N. Rubin and is a co-editor of a collection of work on Steve Biko. His recent work has been marked by a return to an interest in Frantz Fanon (see his edited collection Living Fanon) with a particular focus on the reception of Fanon in popular struggles in South Africa (see Fanonian Practices in South Africa). His Fanon: The Postcolonial Imagination was translated into Arabic in 2013.

His most recent works are Frantz Fanon, Psychiatry and Politics, written with Roberto Beneduce, and preface by Alice Cherki, published by Rowman and Littlefield, with an African edition published by Wits University Press; Fanon Today: Reason and Revolt of the Wretched of the Earth published by Daraja Press. Frantz Fanon: Combat Breathing published by Polity (publisher) with a South African edition published by Wits University Press.

== Affiliation ==
He was previously the Assistant Director of African Studies at Columbia University and a Research Associate in African-American Studies at Harvard University. He is currently Professor at the Marlboro Institute of Interdisciplinary Studies, Emerson College (Boston, MA) and an Honorary Research Professor at the Humanities Unit of the University currently known as Rhodes. He is a member of the Committee for Academic Freedom in Africa.

== Prizes ==
In 2009 he was awarded the Fanon prize by the Caribbean Philosophical Association. According to the association "Gibson has set a high standard in Fanon studies and historically-informed political thought on Africa and the Caribbean."

== Bibliography ==
=== Books ===
- Rethinking Fanon: The Continuing Legacy, Humanity Books, 1999.
- Contested Terrains and Constructed Categories: Contemporary Africa in Focus (with George C. Bond), Westview, 2002.
- Adorno: A Critical Reader (with Andrew N. Rubin), Blackwell, 2002.
- Fanon: The Postcolonial Imagination, Polity, 2003.
- Challenging Hegemony: Social Movements and the Quest for a New Humanism in Post-Apartheid South Africa, Africa World Press, 2006.
- Biko Lives: Contesting the Legacies of Steve Biko (with Andile Mngxitama and Amanda Alexander), Palgrave MacMillan, 2008.
- Fanonian Practices in South Africa: From Steve Biko to Abahlali baseMjondolo, UKZN Press and Palgrave MacMillan, 2011
- Living Fanon: Global Perspectives, Palgrave MacMillan, 2011
- Frantz Fanon, Psychiatry and Politics (with Roberto Beneduce), Rowman and Littlefield International and Wits UP, 2017
- Fanon and the Rationality of Revolt, Daraja Press, 2020
- Fanon Today: Reason and Revolt of the Wretched of the Earth (Editor), Daraja Press, 2021
- Fanon: Combat Breathing, Polity (Black Lives), 2024
