= Abdallah Wafy =

Nigerien civil servant and diplomat (1955–2020)

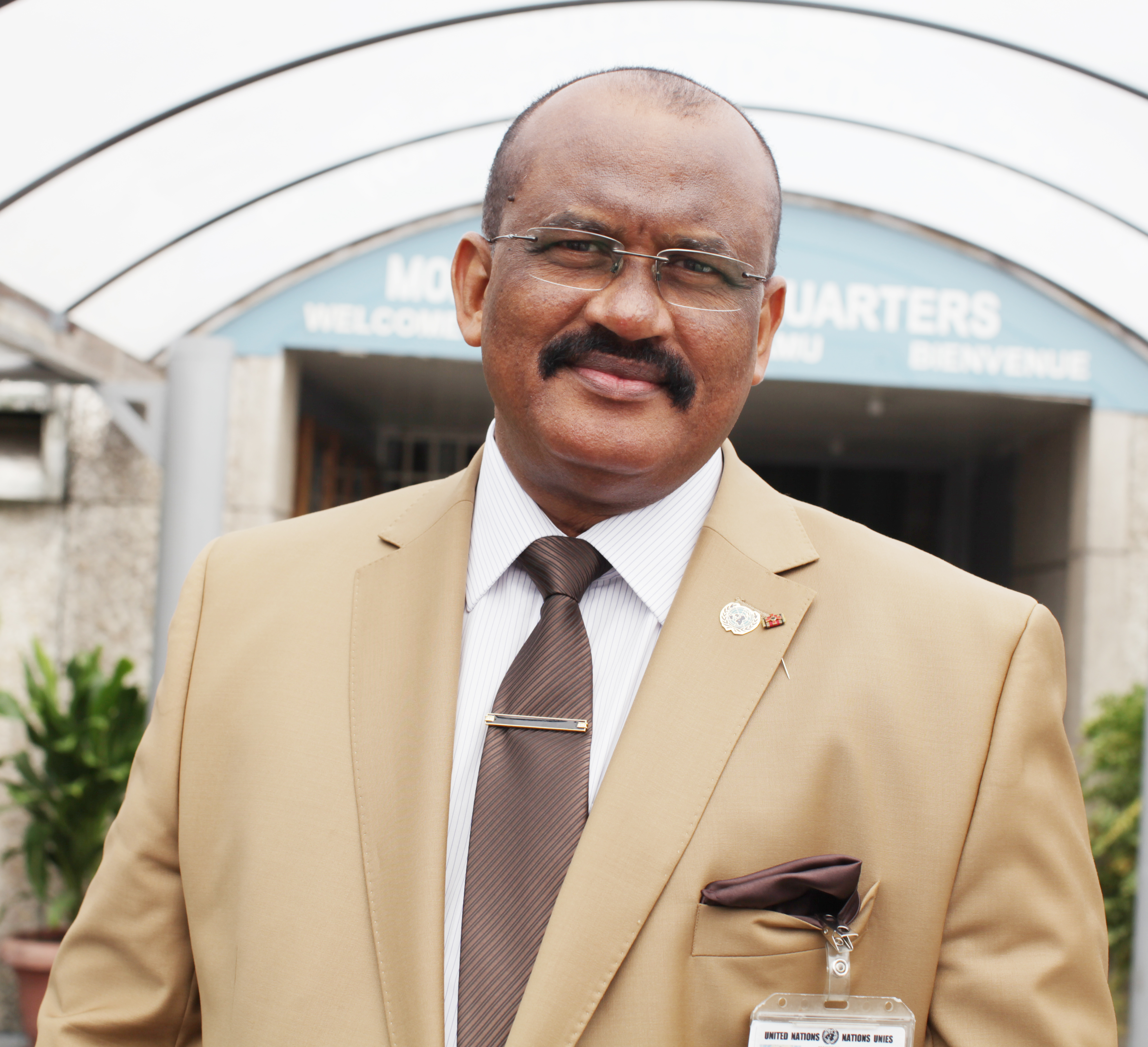

Abdallah Wafy (1955 – 16 December 2020) was a Nigerien civil servant and diplomat. He served as the United Nations Secretary-General's Deputy Special Representative for the Democratic Republic of the Congo of the United Nations Organization Stabilization Mission in the Democratic Republic of the Congo (MONUSCO) from 2013 to 2015. He was in command of the Rule of Law department. He was appointed to this position by United Nations Secretary-General Ban Ki-moon on 26 June 2013. He succeeded Leila Zerrougui from Algeria and was succeeded in 2015 by David Gressly.

At the time of his death, he had been Ambassador to the United States.

== Biography ==
Wafy obtained his master's degree in law from the Université du Bénin, Togo and graduated from the Ecole nationale supérieure de police in France. He held a range of high-ranking positions in the Government of Niger, including as Senior Security Adviser to the Minister for Interior, Public Safety and Decentralization; Inspector General of Police; Special Security Adviser to the President; and Ambassador Extraordinary and Plenipotentiary to Libya and Permanent Representative of the Community of Sahel-Saharan States in Tripoli.

Prior to this appointment, Wafy served as Deputy Special Representative for the Rule of Law in the United Nations Organization Stabilization Mission in Democratic Republic of the Congo (MONUSCO) ad interim since September 2012. He was also the mission's Police Commissioner. He was with the United Nations Operation in Côte d'Ivoire (ONUCI) from 2006 to 2007, and was Deputy Head of the Police component of the United Nations Organization Mission in the Democratic Republic of Congo (MONUC) in 2009.

He was married and had five children.
