= George Caffentzis =

American political philosopher

George Caffentzis (born 1945) is an American political philosopher and an autonomist Marxist. He founded the Midnight Notes Collective, is a founder member of the co-ordinator of the Committee for Academic Freedom in Africa and a professor of philosophy at the University of Southern Maine.

His life partner is Silvia Federici.

== Books ==
- Parole abusate, monete tosate e governo civile. La filosofia del denaro di John Locke, Istituto dell' Enciclopedia Italiana fondata da Giovanni Treccani, Rome, Italy, 1988.
- Clipped Coins, Abused Words and Civil Government: John Locke's Philosophy of Money (New York: Autonomedia/ Semiotext(e) Press, 1989).
- Midnight Oil: Work, Energy, War, 1973–1992, (New York: Autonomedia, 1992) (co-edited). A chapter from Midnight Oil, "Introduction to The New Enclosures," was reprinted in David Solnit (ed.), Globalize Liberation: How to Uproot the System and Build a Better World (San Francisco: City Lights Books, 2004), pp. 61–72.
- A Thousand Flowers: Social Struggles Against Structural Adjustment in African Universities, (Trenton, NJ: Africa World Press, 2000) (co-edited).
- Exciting the Industry of Mankind: George Berkeley's Philosophy of Money (Dordrecht: Kluwer Academic Publishers, 2000).
- Auroras of the Zapatistas: Local and Global Struggles in the Fourth World War, (New York: Autonomedia, 2001) (co-edited).
- In Letters of Blood and Fire: Work, Machines, and Value, (Oakland: PM Press, 2013).
