= Ann Therese Ndong-Jatta =

Gambian politician and civil servant

Minister of Education
- In office 1999–2004
- President: Yahya Jammeh
- Preceded by: Satang Jow

Personal details
- Born: 1956 (age 69–70)
- Education: Bayero University Kano (BA); Vanderbilt University (MSc)
- Occupation: Politician; civil servant

Ann Therese Ndong-Jatta (born 1956) is a Gambian politician and civil servant. Originally working as a Catholic school principal and a civil servant, she served as minister of education from 1999 to 2004, when she left to serve as an official for UNESCO.

== Biography ==
Ann Therese Ndong-Jatta was born in 1956 and attended St. Joseph's High School in Banjul. She got a BA (Honours) in Education, English and History from Bayero University Kano and a MSc in Educational Leadership at Vanderbilt University, the latter under an Africa–America Institute scholarship. She was also a postgraduate certificate student at Harvard University.

Back in the Gambia, Ndong-Jatta held several positions in education, including principal for a Catholic vocational secondary school. She worked in many civil service positions in the Gambian government, including as chief education officer, and director of secondary and tertiary education. In 1999, she became minister of education in the cabinet of Yahya Jammeh, succeeding Satang Jow afterh e stepped down due to health concerns. As minister, she oversaw the creation of another university and specialized in girls' education.

In 2004, Ndong-Jatta stepped down as minister to join UNESCO as Director for Primary Education. In 2008, she became Director of the Office for Education in Africa. In August 2011, she met with vice president Isatou Njie-Saidy in her capacity as a UNESCO official, discussing tpoics like cultural heritage, climate change, and women's issues. On 1 October 2016, she was appointed Director of UNESCO's Regional Office for East Africa in Nairobi, Kenya. She left UNESCO on 30 June 2021.

Alongside Juka Fatou Jabang and Matilda Johnson, she co-wrote the 2005 poetry anthology The Repeal, which Hassoum Ceesay described as the most important Gambian feminist publication since Augusta Jawara's Rebellion (1968).
