= Niger–United States relations =

- Niger: United States

Niger and the United States have bilateral relations. The two countries cooperate on a range of issues, including counter-terrorism, trade and investment, and health and education. On August 4, 2023, Abdourahamane Tiani's military junta severed diplomatic ties with the US after a successful coup d'état deposing Nigerien president Mohamed Bazoum. In 2024, the Niger ended its security cooperation with the United States, stating that the security pact violated the Niger's constitution. In 2025, relations were normalized with the introduction of a new U.S. ambassador and the reopening of consular services at the embassy in Niamey.

The United States is one of Niger's top development partners, providing assistance through various programs to support economic growth, food security, and health care. The United States is Niger's largest trading partner, and there are many American companies operating in Niger, particularly in the mining and energy sectors.

According to the 2018 U.S. Global Leadership Report, 53% of Nigeriens approve of U.S. leadership, with 21% disapproving and 26% uncertain.

After Niger was added to the list of 39 countries for which visa issuance was suspended in 2025, Niger responded by banning the entry of American citizens and announcing that it would cease issuing entry visas to American citizens.

== History ==
U.S. relations with Niger have generally been close and friendly since Niger attained independence. Although USAID does not have a Mission in Niger, $30 million in annual official aid is administered through American and local non-governmental organizations with programs addressing food security, health, local governance, youth training, girls' education, corruption control, and improving the business environment. The U.S. Peace Corps program in Niger started in 1962. It currently has about 130 volunteers in Niger and celebrated its 50th anniversary in Niger in September 2012.

In January 2013, the U.S. and Niger signed an agreement allowing the U.S. to operate unarmed drones from Nigerien territory. In February 2013, the U.S. deployed 100 troops to assist in intelligence collection and will also facilitate intelligence sharing to support French operations in neighboring Mali.

In March 2024, Niger halted “with immediate effect” the military cooperation agreement with the United States of America. According to the government of Niger, the agreement violated Niger's constitution.

== Military relations ==
The United States operated several military bases in Niger, including in Arlit and Agadez.

The Central Intelligence Agency operated a drone base near Dirkou.

In the 2010s, Niger was an important partner for the United States in the fight against terrorism in West Africa and is a member of the Global Coalition to Defeat ISIS. The United States has provided training and equipment to Niger's military and security forces to help them counter terrorism and transnational crime.

In March 2024, Niger announced the termination of its military cooperation deal with the United States and requested the 1,000 American armed forces personnel present to leave the country. Niger's military spokesperson, Col. Amadou Abdramane, stated on national television that the American military presence in Niger is illegal and "“violates all the constitutional and democratic rules, which would require the sovereign people — notably through its elected officials — to be consulted on the installation of a foreign army on its territory." The announcement came shortly after meetings with an American delegation from Washington and the top U.S. commander for Africa, Gen. Michael E. Langley with the Pentagon warning the new government to avoid exporting uranium to Iran or pursue deeper ties with Russia. The move reflected a trend in the Sahel region of countries breaking ties with Western nations and increasingly partnering with Russia instead.

In a report issued by United States Member of Congress Matt Gaetz, Gaetz stated that the United States State embassy in Niger was suppressing information related to the decay of Niger-United States diplomatic relations. According to Gaetz's report, Niger did not authorized flights for United States Department of Defense efforts, including the delivery of food, equipment, mail, or medical supplies.

The U.S. Department of Defense and Niger's Ministry of Defense announced in August 2024 that the U.S. handed over its last military base in Niger, Airbase 201 in Agadez, to local authorities after U.S. troops withdrew from Airbase 101 in Niamey earlier in the month. U.S. troops were set to leave Niger by September 2024 following an agreement with Nigerien authorities. About two dozen soldiers remained for administrative duties at the U.S. embassy.

== Economic relations ==
Niger holds the 160th position among United States trading partners. The total value traded between the United States and Niger in 2019 amounted to $139 million. Exports from the United States to Niger accounted for $93 million; imports of goods from Niger to the United States were valued at $47 million.

== Resident diplomatic missions ==
- Niger has an embassy in Washington, D.C.
- United States has an embassy in Niamey.
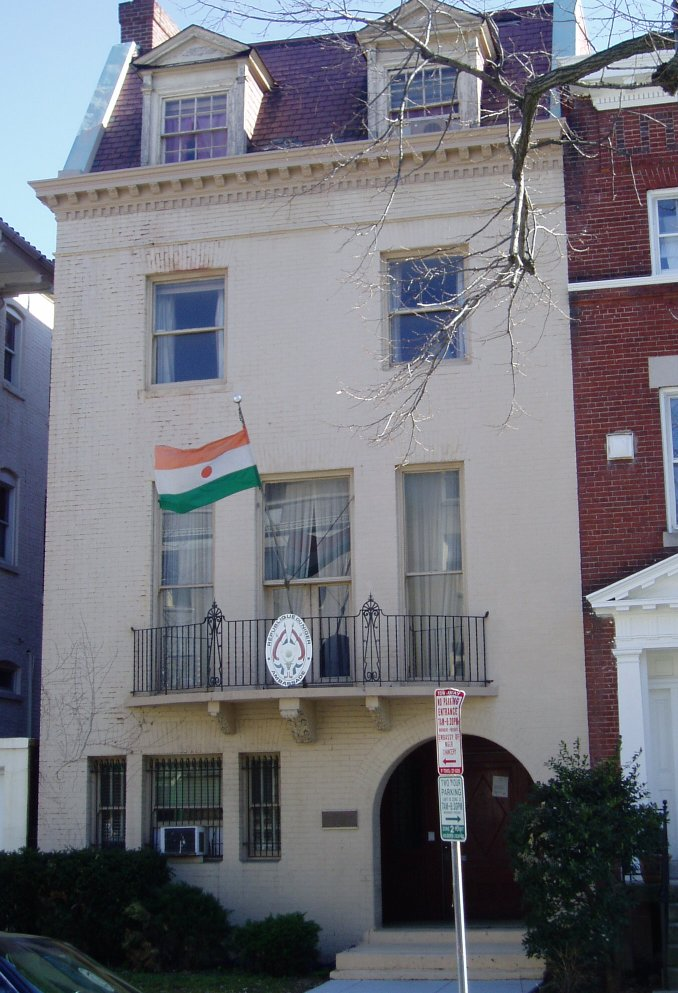
Embassy of Niger in Washington, D.C.

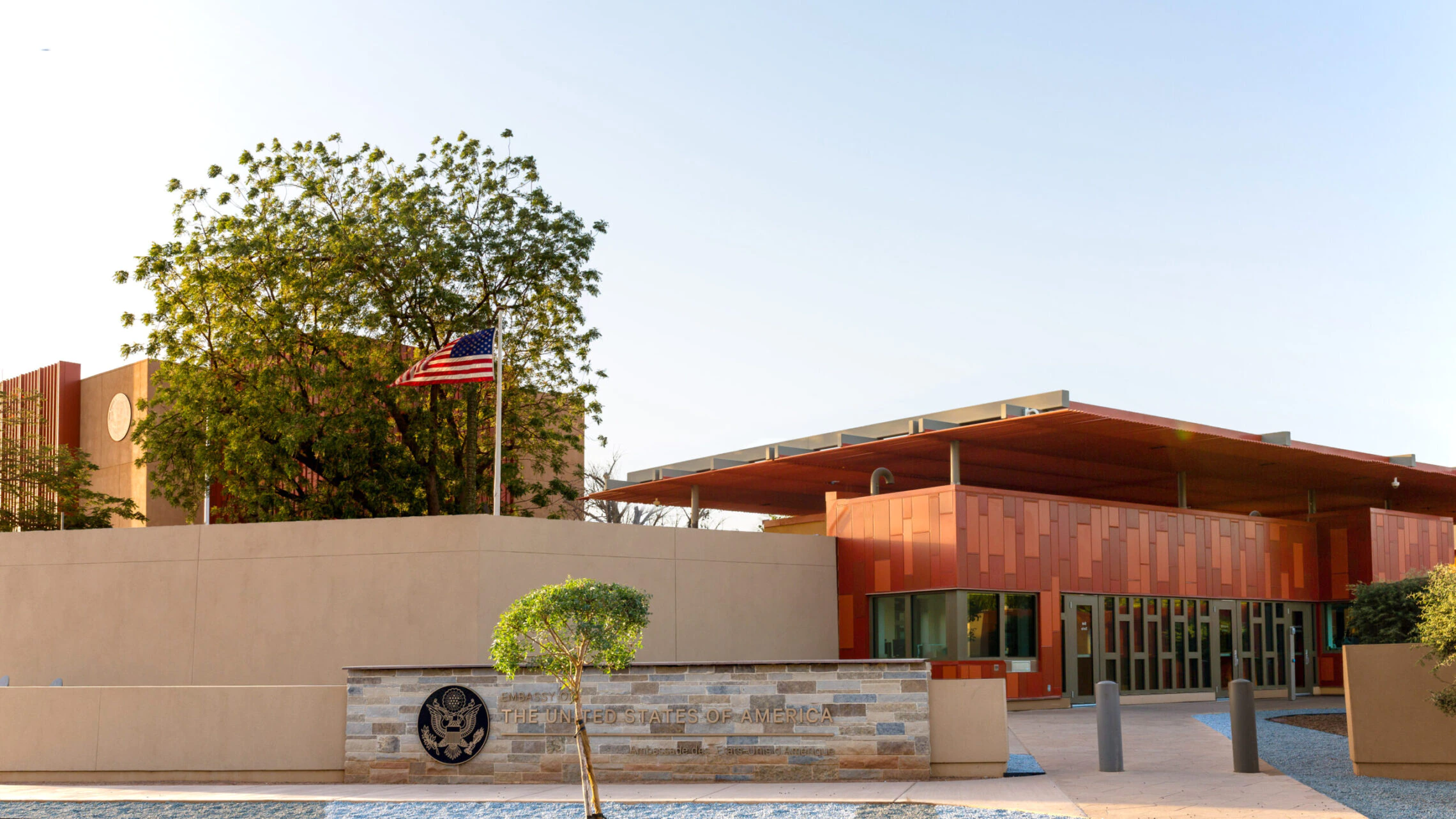
Embassy of the United States in Niamey

== See also ==
- Foreign relations of Niger
- Foreign relations of the United States
- List of ambassadors of Niger to the United States
- United States Ambassador to Niger
