= Matilda Johnson =

Gambian librarian and writer

Matilda Alica Cynthia Johnson (born 7 August 1958 in Bathurst, now Banjul) is a Gambian librarian and writer.

== Education and career ==
In 1984, Johnson studied at Loughborough College where she pursued a Dip (HE) Library course. Later, She obtained a bachelor's degree in Librarianship and Information Studies from the City of Birmingham Polytechnic (now Birmingham City University) in June 1988, thereafter she received a master's degree in the subject.

In the mid-1980s, she worked as a librarian for the Gambian National Library and was a librarian at the Management Development Institute (MDI) until about 2004. Sometime in 2014, she was Deputy Director General of the Gambia National Library Service Authority (GNLSA) which later becomes the Gambian National Library.

Johnson took over the post of Director General of the National Library in 2015. She is also a member of the Chartered Institute of Library and Information Professionals. She is married to James Johnson and has two sons and two daughters with him.

== Other activities ==
Johnson served as a UN Volunteer in 1999 during the independence referendum in East Timor. In addition to her professional activities, Johnson has been involved in the Methodist Church since at least 2003. In 2009, she was elected chair of the Albion Methodist Lower Basic School Board and has been on the board of the Wesley Methodist Contemporary Nursery School Board since 2012. She is also active in the Gambia Christian Council and the Education Advisory Council.

Around 2010/2011 she was president of the Gambian Young Women's Christian Association (YWCA). And was elected vice president of the World Federation of Methodist and Uniting Church Women (WFMUCW) with responsibility for West Africa in 2011.

From 2010 to 2013, she was chair of the organization PRO-HOPE International The Gambia (PHIN Gambia). During the same period, she was active for the Network on Gender Based Violence (NGBV).

== Publications ==
Johnson published literary works in various newspapers and magazines by the late 1990s. In 2005, she published poems in the anthology The Repeal and other poems which Hassoum Ceesay described as the most important Gambian feminist publication since Augusta Jawara's rebellion (1968).

== Works ==
- 2005: The Repeal and Other Poems (anthology with works by Johnson, Ann Therese Ndong-Jatta and Juka Jabang) Fulladu Publishers, Fajara.
