= Brian Atwood =

American shoe designer

- Born: August 4, 1967 (age 59)
- Education: Fashion Institute of Technology, Joliet Catholic High School, Southern Illinois University
- Occupations: Shoe designer, Model

Brian Atwood (born August 4, 1967) is an American shoe designer of Mexican descent. He studied at the Fashion Institute of Technology before becoming a model.

== Women's shoe designer ==
In 1996, after modeling for seven years he was the first American designer hired by Gianni Versace in Milan, later being chief designer of women's accessories. Atwood was named the Shoe Designer of the year in 2010 and 2011 by the Red Carpet Fashion Awards. and was recipient of the CDA Swarovski Perry Ellis Award for Best Accessory Design and the 2010 Footwear News Designer of the Year award.

=== Design philosophy ===
Summarizing his design philosophy Atwood said, “It’s not only 20-year-olds who want a six-inch heel.” But conversely he stated, “some women don’t want or can’t walk in the high heels. That’s something we’re responding to very quickly. They like the fun fashion shoe — on a sensible heel, sometimes." He also likened his philosophy for designing for women on women's whimsical relationship with shoes. “I’ve always compared my work to the Cinderella factor, where her life changed when she slid into that shoe. It’s kind of magical, the relationship women have with their shoes.”

== Shoe line ==
The Brian Atwood shoe line was launched in 2001. His budget line of shoes is B Brian Atwood. This brand retails for US$200 to US$500 as opposed to his main line of shoes which retails for $525 to $2900. The B Brian Atwood brand was later entered into a partnership agreement with shoemaker, Steve Madden (NASDAQ:SHOO), who purchased the Jones Group stake.

== Author ==
He is the author of the book, Pumped, a study of stiletto heels.

== Media coverage ==
Atwood was covered as his shoes being worn by Lady Gaga at her 30th birthday party Media coverage of Atwood has included Bebo, and Jessica Chastain. His Instagram account reportedly has 460,000 followers. He has been described as a shoe guru. In 2012, Atwood advertisements in New York were banned for nudity.

== Personal life ==
He attended Joliet Catholic High School in Joliet, IL. and studied art and architecture at Southern Illinois University. He further studied clothes design at the Fashion Institute of Technology (FIT) in New York, NY. Atwood is married to Dr. Jake Deutsch. The couple live in Hudson Yards in the New York area. They have two dogs, Zeffirelli and Tiberius.
