= Caliban and the Witch =

2004 book by Silvia Federici

- Author: Silvia Federici
- Language: English
- Publisher: Autonomedia
- Publication date: 2004
- Pages: 288
- ISBN: 978-0-241-53253-9

Caliban and the Witch: Women, the Body and Primitive Accumulation is a 2004 book by Italian-American intellectual Silvia Federici. Responding to both feminist and Marxist traditions, the book offers a critical alternative to Karl Marx's theory of primitive accumulation.

== Title and publication ==
The title of the book references Shakespeare's The Tempest: Caliban's mother was the witch Sycorax:

This mis-shapen knave,
His mother was a witch; and one so strong
That could control the moon, make flows and ebbs,
And deal in her command without her power.

— Act 5, Scene 1

The front illustration is adapted from a fresco at the Scrovegni Chapel, Italy, depicting the deadly sin of wrath.

== Outline ==
Caliban and the Witch explores gender and the family during the primitive accumulation of capital. As part of the radical autonomist feminist Marxist tradition, the book offers a critical alternative to Marx's theory of primitive accumulation. Federici argues that the witch hunts served to restructure family relations and the role of women in order to satisfy society's needs during the rise of capitalism.

In the book's introduction, Federici states that she was motivated in part by "the desire to rethink the development of capitalism from a feminist viewpoint, while at the same time, avoiding the limits of a "women's history" separated from that of the male part of the working class."

== Chapters ==
=== All the World Needs a Jolt ===
The first chapter traces the history of the struggle between the medieval proletariat and the nobility and Church — including in certain countries, how the nobility intensified misogyny to divide proletariat rebellion along the axis of sex, the stigmatization of (proletariat-dominated) heretical sects that provided for greater female autonomy and sexual liberty, and the crushing of peasant rebellions.

Federici begins by discussing the division of labor and the role of women in feudal manors; she argues that while peasant women were subject to sexist restrictions (e.g., not being permitted to hold certain roles), they were able to control some of the products of their own labor, and that common land and collective sex-segregated labor provided the conditions for female solidarity. Federici then follows the development of serf resistance against landlords, and serfs' connections to the development of heretical sects (e.g., Bogomils, Cathars, Waldenses, and Taborites).

From 1347 to 1352, the Black Death killed around a third of Europeans, causing a massive labor shortage and intensifying worker resistance (e.g. the 1381 Peasants' Revolt). By the late 1300s, France and Venice functionally legalized raping proletarian women, and from 1350-1450 both Italy and France opened tax-funded, publicly-managed brothels—Federici proposes that the nobility used these measures so that proletarian men would vent their frustrations upon proletarian women, and notes that the Church approved of prostitution as a means to ensure workers were not lured into heretic sects (who had a reputation for both sexual licentiousness and fomenting rebellion). However, the European class conflict escalated into bloody wars like the German Peasants' War of the 1500s, during which the crushing of peasant rebels cemented the power of the nobility and Church.

=== The Great Witch-Hunt in Europe ===
Federici begins by noting that the concept of witch-hunts was new in European discourse in the mid-1400s. Laws and codes declaring witchcraft itself (rather than its ill effects) punishable by death were only created in the mid-1500s, concurrent with the Scientific Revolution. Federici notes that the persecution of witches originated as a preoccupation of the upper classes—and the information that intellectuals, clergy, and magistrates created was disseminated to the common people by the pamphlets they published, the art they commissioned, and the laws and religious canon they wrote.

Federici states that "If we consider the historical context in which the witch hunt occurred, the gender and class of the accused, and the effects of persecution," then the inevitable conclusion is that it was an attack (premeditated or not) on "women's resistance to the spread of capitalist relations and the power that women had gained by virtue of their sexuality, their control over reproduction, and their ability to heal." The witches persecuted were typically poor women older than 40, often beggars; in Ireland and the Scottish Western Highlands, where collective land-tenure and kinship ties provided a social safety net unknown to laborers on enclosed lands, there is no record of witch-hunts.

== See also ==
- Marxist feminism
- Wages for housework
- Witch trials in the early modern period
