= Alidou Barkire =

Nigerien politician (born 1925)

Minister of justice
- In office 1970–1974

Secretary general of national defence and director of national defence in Niger.
- In office 1962 – Before 1970

Personal details
- Born: 1925 Niamey
- Occupation: Teacher, politician

Alidou Barkire (born 1925) is a Nigerien politician and former minister of justice. Alidou was born and educated in Niamey, and trained to become a teacher in what is now Mali, after which he briefly served in the colonial army and then taught in French Sudan. In 1962 he became secretary general of national defence and director of national defence in Niger. He was minister of justice from 1970 until the 1974 Nigerien coup d'état.
