= Silvia Federici =

Italian-American scholar, teacher, and feminist activist (born 1942)

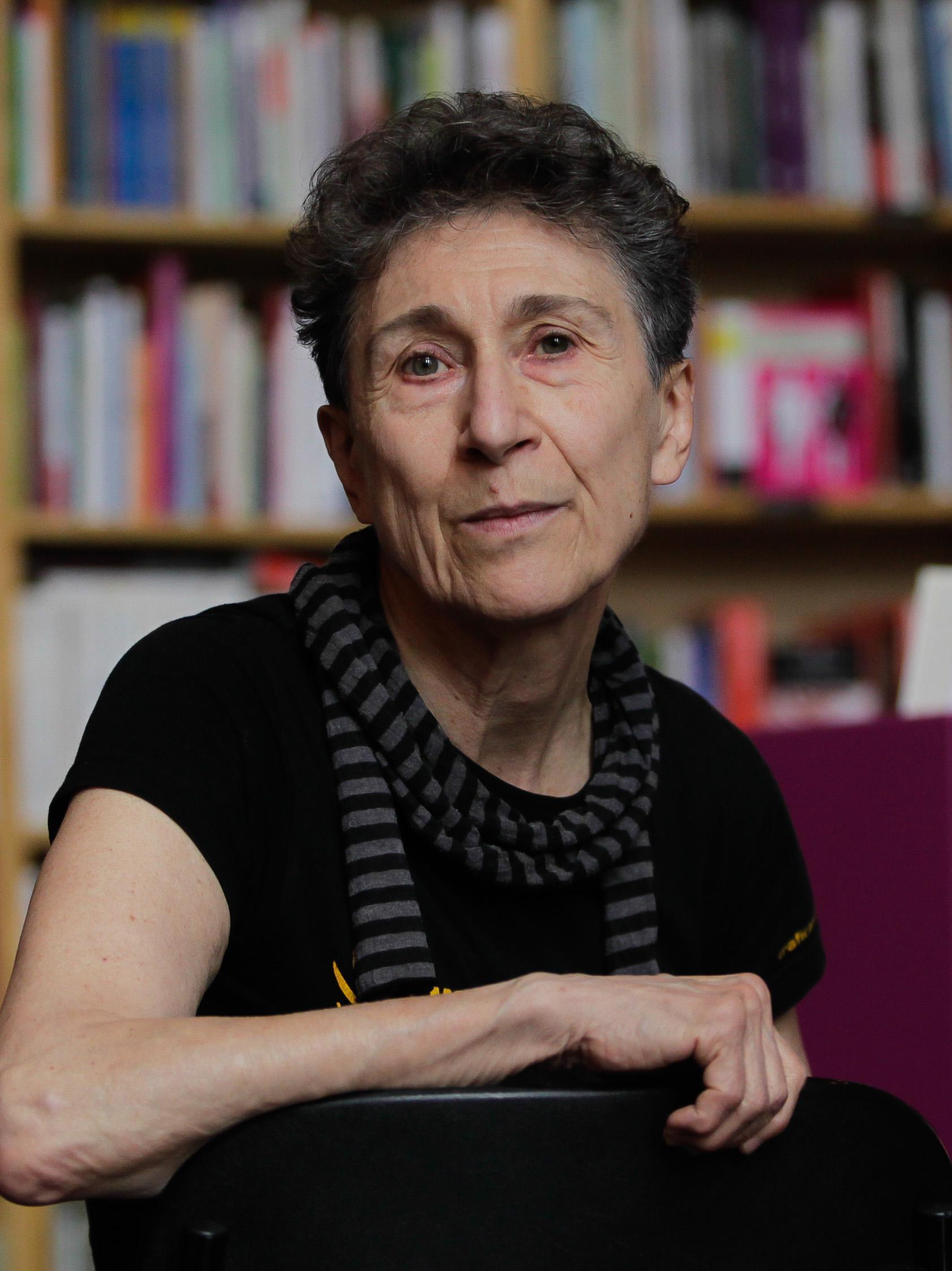
- Federici being interviewed in 2014
- Born: April 1942 (age 84); Parma, Italy
- Partner: George Caffentzis

Education
- Education: University of Bologna (BA); University at Buffalo (MA, PhD)
- Thesis: The Development of Lukács' Realism (1980)

Philosophical work
- Era: Contemporary philosophy
- Region: Western philosophy
- School: Continental philosophy; Autonomism; Marxist feminism
- Institutions: University of Port Harcourt; Hofstra University
- Notable works: Wages Against Housework (1975); Caliban and the Witch (2004)

Silvia Federici (Italian pronunciation: [ˈsilvja fedeˈriːtʃi]; born April 1942) is an Italian-American scholar, teacher, and Marxist feminist activist based in New York. She is considered one of the leading theoreticians in Marxist feminist theory, women's history, political philosophy, and the history and theory of the commons. Her most famous book, Caliban and the Witch (2004), has been translated into numerous languages and adopted in college courses.

For several decades, she has worked with a variety of international feminist organizations, such as Women in Nigeria (WIN) and the Latin American-based Ni una menos, to combat gender-based violence. In the 2010s, she organized a project with feminist collectives in Spain to reconstruct the history of women persecuted as witches in early modern Europe, and to raise awareness about what she believes are contemporary witch-hunts still taking place around the world.

== Early life and education ==
Federici was born in Parma in Fascist-ruled Italy in April 1942. She left for Casalmaggiore with her parents after the Allied invasion of Italy in 1943 and grew up there until returning to Parma, where her father taught secondary-level philosophy, in 1955. She received a bachelor's degree in modern languages and literature from the University of Bologna in 1965. With the aid of a Fulbright scholarship, she moved to the United States in 1967 to study for a PhD in philosophy at the University at Buffalo. After obtaining an MA degree in philosophy in 1971, she completed her doctorate in 1980 with a dissertation entitled The Development of Lukács' Realism, an examination of the philosophical and aesthetic development of György Lukács. The dissertation challenges interpretations that divide Lukács's intellectual development into sharply separated pre-Marxist, Marxist-Hegelian and later aesthetic periods, instead emphasizing continuities in his attempts to reconcile idealism, Marxism and a realist conception of an objective world. During the period in which she was developing this work, Federici published "Notes on Lukács' Aesthetics" in Telos in 1972.

== Academic career ==
Federici taught at the University of Port Harcourt in Nigeria from 1984 to 1986. In 1987, she became an associate professor and later professor of political philosophy and international studies at Hofstra University in New York. Following her retirement in 2005, she holds the title of professor emerita at Hofstra.

== Activism ==
In 1972, with Mariarosa Dalla Costa and Selma James, Federici co-founded the International Feminist Collective, the organization that launched the campaign Wages for Housework. In 1973, she helped start "Wages for Housework" groups in the U.S. In 1975, she published the pamphlet Wages Against Housework, the document most associated with the Wages for Housework movement.

In the 1980s and 1990s, Federici was a member of the Midnight Notes Collective. In 1990, she co-founded the Committee for Academic Freedom in Africa (CAFA) and, with Ousseina Alidou, edited the CAFA bulletin for over a decade. Her involvement with CAFA led to her serving for several years as an Executive member of the Association of Concerned Africa Scholars (ACAS).

In 1995, during the campaign to free African-American journalist Mumia Abu-Jamal from death row, Federici helped launch the Anti-Death Penalty Project (ADPP) within the Radical Philosophy Association. Along with ADPP co-leaders George Caffentzis and Everet Green, Federici encouraged the global academic community to agitate against the death penalty.

She has been involved in the anti-globalization movement.

In March 2022, Federici was among the 151 feminists worldwide who signed Feminist Resistance Against War: A Manifesto, in solidarity with the Russian Feminist Anti-War Resistance. (Note: This manifesto was criticized by both Ukrainian feminists and members of the Feminist Anti-War Resistance themselves.)

== Scholarly contributions ==
Federici's best-known book, Caliban and the Witch: Women, the Body and Primitive Accumulation (2004), expands on the work of Leopoldina Fortunati to investigate the reasons for the witch hunts that occurred in the early modern period, but Federici puts greater emphasis on a feminist interpretation. In the book, she argues against the traditional understanding of Karl Marx's concept of primitive accumulation, which is viewed as a necessary precursor for capitalism. Instead, she posits that primitive accumulation is a fundamental characteristic of capitalism itself—that the economic system, in order to perpetuate itself, requires a constant infusion of expropriated capital. She connects this expropriation to women's unpaid labour, via reproduction and otherwise, which she frames as a historical precondition to the rise of a capitalist economy predicated upon wage labor. Related to this, she outlines the historical struggles for the commons and for communalism. Instead of seeing capitalism as a liberatory defeat of feudalism, Federici interprets the ascent of capitalism as a reactionary move to subvert the rising tide of communalism and to retain the basic social contract.

She situates the institutionalization of rape and prostitution—as well as the heretic and witch-hunt trials, burnings and torture—at the center of a systematic suppression of women and appropriation of their labor. This is tied into colonial expropriation and provides a framework for understanding the work of the International Monetary Fund, World Bank, and other proxy institutions as engaging in a renewed cycle of primitive accumulation, by which everything held in common—from water, to seeds, to our genetic code—becomes privatized in what amounts to a new round of enclosures.

Often described as a counterpoint to Marx's account of "primitive accumulation", Caliban reconstructs the history of capitalism, highlighting the continuity between the capitalist subjugation of women, the transatlantic slave trade, and the colonization of the Americas. The book has been described as "a retelling of the birth of capitalism that places women at the center of the story".

== Personal life ==
Federici lives in Park Slope, Brooklyn, with her partner George Caffentzis. She was previously married to physicist Michael Kosok.

== Bibliography ==
=== Author ===
- Wages Against Housework (PDF). Bristol: Power of Women Collective; Falling Wall Press. 1975. ISBN 978-0950270296. 8-page pamphlet.
- Il Grande Calibano: Storia del corpo sociale ribelle nella prima fase del capitale (in Italian). Milan: Franco Angeli. 1984. OCLC 20376620. Co-written with Leopoldina Fortunati.
- "Il Femminismo e il Movimento contro la guerra USA". DeriveApprodi (in Italian). No. 24. 2004.
- Caliban and the Witch: Women, the Body and Primitive Accumulation. Brooklyn, New York: Autonomedia. 2004. ISBN 978-1570270598 – via Internet Archive.
- Revolution at Point Zero: Housework, Reproduction, and Feminist Struggle (PDF). PM Press. 2012. ISBN 978-1604863338 – via Midnight Notes Collective.
- Emre, Merve, ed. (2018). "Every Woman Is a Working Woman". Once and Future Feminist. Cambridge, Massachusetts: Boston Review. ISBN 978-1946511102.
- Witches, Witch-Hunting, and Women. Oakland, California: PM Press. 2018. ISBN 978-1629635682.
- Re-enchanting the World: Feminism and the Politics of the Commons. Oakland, California: PM Press. 2018. ISBN 978-1629635699.
- Beyond the Periphery of the Skin: Rethinking, Remaking, Reclaiming the Body in Contemporary Capitalism. Oakland, California: PM Press. 2020. ISBN 978-1629637068.
- Patriarchy of the Wage: Notes on Marx, Gender, and Feminism. Oakland, California: PM Press. 2021. ISBN 978-1629638584.

=== Editor ===
- (1995) (ed.) Enduring Western Civilization: The Construction of the Concept of Western Civilization and Its "Others". Westport, Connecticut, and London: Praeger.
- (2000) (ed.) A Thousand Flowers: Structural Adjustment and the Struggle for Education in Africa. Africa World Press. Co-edited with George Caffentzis and Ousseina Alidou.
- (2000) (ed.) African Visions: Literary Images, Political Change, and Social Struggle in Contemporary Africa. Westport, Connecticut, and London: Praeger. Co-edited with Joseph McLaren and Cheryl Mwaria.
- (2021) (ed.) Feminicide and Global Accumulation: Frontline Struggles to Resist the Violence of Patriarchy and Capitalism. Brooklyn, New York: Common Notions. Co-edited with Susana Draper and Liz Mason-Deese.
