= Sirleaf Market Women's Fund =

The Sirleaf Market Women's Fund (SMWF) is NGO dedicated to supporting women in Liberia and the rest of Africa.

== Background ==
During 14 years of savage civil war, Liberia's market women kept food and supplies flowing against terrible odds. As the conflict worsened, they gathered together praying for peace, then protesting and finally politicking in the international arena. After peace took hold, in 2005 they turned their hard-won organizational skills to get out the vote for Ellen Johnson Sirleaf, Africa's first woman to be elected president—the granddaughter of a market woman.

The idea of the market women's fund emerged from discussions between President Sirleaf and a group of women outside of Liberia who, in 2004, had written Liberian Women Peace Makers: Fighting for the Right to be Seen, Heard and Counted. In December 2005, ten days after the Liberian election, the group decided to create the Ellen Johnson Sirleaf Market Women's Fund (SMWF).

Formally established at the end of 2006, the fund has partnered with the Government of Liberia, international organizations, including the United Nations Development Program (UNDP), United Nations Development Fund for Women (UNIFEM), the African Women's Development Fund (AWDF), and non-governmental organizations, to improve the lives of tens of thousands of market women and their families—and to advance women's human rights.

== Current Activities ==
SMWF employs several means to ensure the health, self-sufficiency and dignity of the market women. It assists Liberia's efforts to transform existing markets into safe and clean environments. It supports micro-credit for entrepreneurial women to establish or expand their small businesses. It offers training in literacy and small business management, enabling traders to provide a wider array of goods and earn profits sufficient to sustain them and their families. It provides daycare facilities for children where safety and pre-primary education will be ensured.

== Organization ==
SMWF/Liberia is registered in Monrovia, Liberia, as a non-profit organization with its own Board of Directors and staff. Representatives of the Liberian Marketing Association and other local agencies are on the board of directors to provide political and technical know-how. SMWF/Liberia cooperates closely with its primary fundraisers, SMWF/US, sharing progress reports twice annually and annual audits of its finances.

SMWF/US, the international board headquartered in New York, is a volunteer fundraising arm. With the exception of minimal overhead, all contributions go to Liberia for the market program. SMWF receives contributions from many individual donors as well as soliciting larger grants. Board members of SMWF/US work closely with their Liberian counterparts and visit Liberia several times annually to observe progress toward shared goals. SMWF/US, with headquarters in New York, is a not-for-profit organization with 501(c)(3) status so that contributions may be tax-exempt in accordance with US federal law.

== Markets ==
In 2007, 83 markets and the women working in them were surveyed by a Liberian consulting firm through a partnership with SMWF, the Ministry for Gender and Development, the Ministry of Commerce and Industry, UNDP and UNIFEM. The survey found approximately 204,000 market women in Liberia. More than 50 percent of them were heads of household—sole breadwinners—yet had no formal education. Their families often include six to eight children, some orphans of war or of AIDS. Of the markets surveyed, two-thirds had been badly damaged. Only about a third had sanitary facilities or garbage disposal, and hardly any had storage on site, making security a major problem.

The design of the SMWF market structure includes a concrete shelter with built-in tables, water and sanitation, storage facilities, literacy and business training, basic health services, especially in rural areas, and space for children to play or be occupied in a nursery school. A special part of the market houses a banking window. To date, SMWF has built or renovated 13 markets and is working on more for a total of 50. As of 2010 funding for an additional 9 markets has been identified.

The following markets were restored or completed as of 2009:

- Barnersville Market
- Bopolu Market
- Duala Market
- ELWA Market
- Nancy Doe Market
- Paynesville Market
- Rally Time Market
- Redemption Day Market
- Saclepea Market
- Totota Market
- Zgolemain Market
- Zorzor Market
- Zwedru Market

== Credits ==
SMWF markets have three different levels of credit. Special banking windows in the market have been established in partnership with Ecobank Liberia. Ecobank also has set up a program of training in small business management.

The SMWF Microcredit Program is made up entirely of marketers. A rural group contains six persons who can borrow $50 each. An urban group has six members who can borrow $100 each. Every group has a representative who is the “eye” of the group and a secretary who must be literate. A vetting committee (including the market superintendent) decides who is credit-worthy. The group pays a percentage of the amount borrowed but gets a rebate if they pay back on time. Savings receive a small interest rate. As of May 1, 2010, the micro-credit program had provided loans to 328 women in both rural and urban areas. An overwhelming number of marketers and communities have requested micro-credit capability through SMWF.

The following markets currently benefit from the SMWF micro-credit program:

- Nancy B. Doe Market
- Barnersville Market
- Paynesville Central Market
- Zorzor Market
- Totota Market

Many marketers also have their own traditional joint Susu (savings) groups. Members put in a certain amount, and every month one of them receives the combined input of the other members.

== Literacy training ==
UNIFEM has provided funding for literacy training. Following an October 2009 survey by Alfaden, a joint effort of the non-profit organizations Alfalit and DEN/L, adult literacy training was offered in 11 markets in the following areas:

- Bong (Totota)
- Gbarpolu (Popolu area)
- Lofa
- Montserrado (Monrovia area)
- Nimba/Grand Gedeh

27 literacy facilitators were trained in both the Paulo Freire and Laubach methods. By May 1, 2010, some 500 market women were learning to read and write.

== Awards ==
Partnerships, within Liberia and outside of it, led to recognition by the UN Office for Technical Cooperation Among Developing Countries (TCDC). At the end of 2008 it honored SMWF with its Special Award for South-South Cooperation.

In July 2010, UN Fund for Gender Equality announced it was awarding SMWF US$3 million over four years to improve the lives of Liberia's market women, their families and the national economy. This program will be a high-profile prototype with potential for replication throughout the Africa region.

Following up on their pledge at SMWF's 2008 fundraiser to “Adopt a Market,” on July 11, 2010, the Alpha Kappa Alpha (AKA) sorority gave President Ellen Johnson Sirleaf $500,000 for a market in the Paynesville Red-Light Community outside of Monrovia. When completed, it will be the biggest so far and will provide a learning environment for pre-school children as well as adult literacy, health facilities, cold storage, a bank, a police depot, and ample parking.

SMWF receives contributions from many individual donors as well as larger grants.

== About Liberia ==
=== History ===
Liberia was founded in 1816 as a place of resettlement for freed North American slaves and became an independent republic in 1847. Between 1847 and 1980 its politics and economics were dominated to a large extent by those settlers and their descendants. Issues of inequitable access and opportunity and outright discrimination became a focus of resentment that came to a head in the 1980 coup d'état led by Sergeant Samuel Doe. His bloody coup was the precursor of a political reign characterized by corruption, violence and economic decline.

The First Liberian Civil War of 1989-1997 and the fighting that renewed soon after (Second Liberian Civil War), lasting until the peace agreement of 2003, affected every area of Liberia, every village and town, and every family. It was a terrifying experience.

After 46 tries (political mediation meetings, ceasefire agreements and a dozen failed peace agreements), finally, on August 18, 2003, a Comprehensive Peace Agreement was signed among the warring parties in Ghana under UN auspices, and an interim President installed. In January 2006, after a hard-fought campaign against a Liberian football star, Ellen Johnson Sirleaf took office as Liberia's – and Africa's – first democratically elected female Head of State.

=== History of the Market Women ===
Liberian Women Peacemakers tells the story of Liberian women's continuing struggle for peace and gender justice through 2003, profiling16 women who started with treating the wounded and moving food through the country, then took to the streets and finally into peace conferences to protest the killings and demand an end to war. Pray the Devil Back to Hell, a 2008 documentary directed by Gini Reticker and produced by Abigail Disney, told the story of the Liberian market women who were able to triumphantly bring an end to the Liberian civil war.
