= Satang Jow =

Gambian politician

- Born: August 31, 1943 (age 82); Banjul, The Gambia
- Citizenship: Gambia
- Education: Bachelor of Arts – Fourah Bay College, University of Sierra Leone (1966); Postgraduate Certificate in Education – Institute of Education, University of London (1969)
- Alma mater: Fourah Bay College, University of Sierra Leone; Institute of Education, University of London
- Occupations: Educationist, public servant
- Years active: 1966–present
- Employer: Government of The Gambia
- Known for: Minister for Education; Minister for Youth, Culture and Sports
- Awards: Honorary Doctorate (Honoris Causa), University of The Gambia

Satang Jow (born August 31, 1943) in Banjul is a Gambian educationist and public servant who served as minister for education and youth, culture, and sports.

== Early life and education ==
Satang Jow was born on August 31, 1943, in Banjul, The Gambia. She is the daughter of H. O. Semega-Janneh. Mrs. Jow's academic journey began at St. Joseph's School and continued at The Gambia High School, where she laid a strong foundation for her future achievements. In pursuit of higher education, she attended Fourah Bay College, University of Sierra Leone, where she graduated with a Bachelor of Arts degree in 1966. She furthered her studies at the Institute of Education, University of London, earning a Postgraduate Certificate in Education in 1969.

== Career ==
Satang Jow dedicated much of her career to education. She began teaching at The Gambia High School in 1966 and served there until 1994. She served as the principal of the Gambia High School from 1989 to 1994. Her career took a significant turn after the 1994 coup in The Gambia when she was appointed Secretary of State (SoS) for Education by the Junta leader Yahya Jammeh. In the 1990s, Jow was a minister for education and for youth, sports, and culture in the Gambian government. In 1995, she became SoS for Youth, Culture, and Sports, before returning to the education portfolio in 1997. Among her notable achievements as education minister was the establishment of a University Commission, which laid the groundwork for the creation of the University of The Gambia in 1999. Jow served as a Commissioner in the Sierra Leone Truth and Reconciliation Commission from May 2002 to April 2004.

== Later role ==
Beyond her ministerial work, Satang Jow contributed significantly to regional and international efforts. She served as a member of the Gambian West African Examination Council Committee and participated in various organisations that supported education and social development.

== Awards ==
In recognition of her outstanding contributions to education in The Gambia, the University of The Gambia awarded her an honorary doctorate degree (honoris causa). This accolade highlights her enduring influence on educational attainment in the nation.
