= Hassana Alidou =

Nigerien educationist and diplomat (1963–2023)

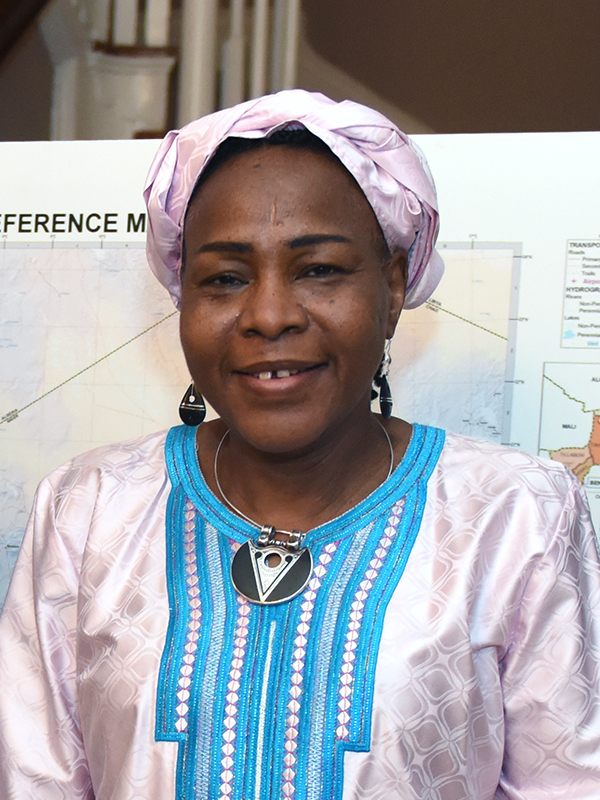
- Born: 29 March 1963; Niamey, Niger
- Died: 10 June 2023 (aged 60)
- Education: Abdou Moumouni University; University of Illinois
- Occupations: Educationist, diplomat

Hassana Alidou (29 March 1963 − 10 June 2023) was a Nigerien diplomat who served as Ambassador to the United States and Canada from 2015 to 2019. She then became the first scholar in residence for the Union Institute and University Institute for Social Justice.

Her twin sister Ousseina Alidou is an Africanist scholar specializing in the study of Muslim women in Africa, and a professor in the Department of African American and African Studies at Rutgers University.

== Biography ==
Alidou graduated from the Université de Niamey in 1987 with a B.S. in linguistics. Unable to pursue graduate trainings in Niger, she received a Thomas Jefferson Fellowship which she used to the University of Illinois. After she earned a master's degree in linguistics in 1991. After teaching at Illinois, she returned to Niger in 1993 and was a lecturer at the Université de Niamey.

Alidou died on 10 June 2023, at the age of 60.
