= Anne Kabagambe =

Ugandan businesswoman

- Born: Anne Kabagambe https://www.annekabagambe.com/ Uganda
- Education: UC San Diego; Columbia University (MIA); George Washington University (MPP); John F. Kennedy School of Government at Harvard University; Cranfield School of Management
- Occupations: International development and finance executive
- Years active: 1981–present
- Children: 1
- Website: https://www.annekabagambe.com/

Anne Kabagambe is an Ugandan international development and finance executive. She was the executive director of the International Bank for Reconstruction and Development, representing the World Bank Group's Africa Group 1 constituency. She is a board member of Barrick Gold and Financial Services Volunteer Corps.

== Early life and education ==
Anne Kabagambe was born in Kisoro, Uganda.

She holds a bachelor's degree from the University of California at San Diego and master's degrees in international affairs from Columbia University and Public Policy from George Washington University. Kabagambe has also completed executive training programs at Harvard Business School (Corporate Board Effectiveness), the John F. Kennedy School of Government at Harvard University (Strategic Public-Sector Negotiations), and Cranfield School of Management(Leadership and Management).

== Career ==
=== Early career and African Development Bank ===
Anne Kabagambe began her career representing the City of New York on trade and investment opportunities in China, India and the Middle East. She also worked for the United Nations and the Third World Institute in New York City. In 1989, Kabagambe joined the African Development Bank, where she eventually rose to her final position as chief of staff and director of cabinet. She was part of the team tasked with the formulation of the Bank's long-term strategy, and also played a role in its responses to the 2008 financial crisis and the Western African Ebola virus epidemic. In January 2016, she joined the board of trustees at the Africa-America Institute.

=== World Bank ===
In November 2018, Kabagambe was elected as the executive director of the World Bank Group's Africa Group 1 Constituency, representing Botswana, Burundi, Eritrea, Eswatini, Ethiopia, the Gambia, Kenya, Lesotho, Liberia, Malawi, Mozambique, Namibia, Rwanda, Seychelles, Sierra Leone, Somalia, South Sudan, Sudan, Tanzania, Uganda, Zambia and Zimbabwe—after having been as the constituency's alternate executive director. She became the second woman to hold the position after Ethiopia's Mulu Ketsela. She was co-chair of the World Bank Board's working group on gender and is a member of the board's committees on budget and development effectiveness.

== Personal life ==
Kabagambe has a son. She speaks English and French.

Diplomatic posts
Preceded by Andrew Bvumbe	Former executive director of the World Bank Group (Africa Group I constituency); 2016–2020	Incumbent
