= Insignificance =

Emotional feeling or mental state

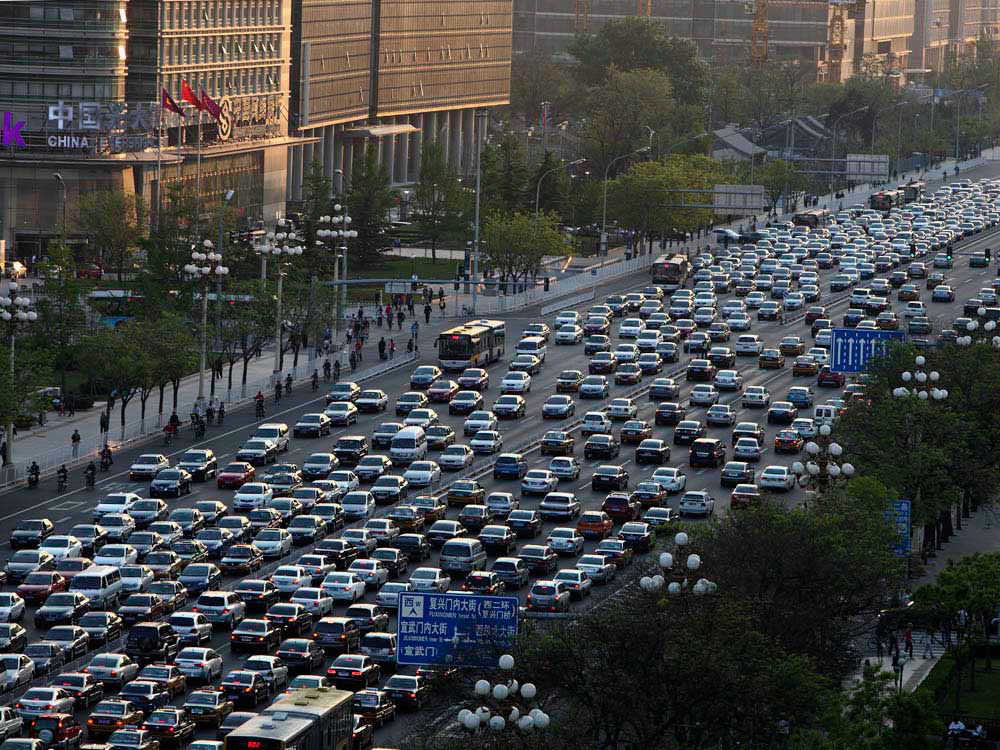
In modern society, people may feel insignificant for a number of reasons, including from living in a huge, impersonal city (pictured is Chang'an Avenue in Beijing).

People may face feelings of insignificance due to a number of causes, including having low self-esteem, being depressed, living in a huge, impersonal city, comparing themselves to wealthy celebrity success stories, working in a huge bureaucracy, or being in awe of a natural wonder.

== Psychological factors ==
A person's "...sense of personal insignificance comes from two primary experiences: (a) the developmental experience with its increasing awareness of separation and loss, transience, and the sense of lost felt perfectibility; and (b) the increasing cognitive awareness of the immutable laws of biology and the limitations of the self and others in which idealization gives way to painful reality." To deal with feelings of insignificance, "...each individual seeks narcissistic reparation through the elaboration of a personal narrative or myth, a story, which gives one's life a feeling of personal significance, meaning, and purpose." These "...myths provide the individual with a personal sense of identity, and they confirm and affirm memberships in a group or community, and provide guidelines and an idealized set of behaviors..., [and] endorse an explanation for the mysterious universe."

In modern society, people living in crowded, anonymous major cities may face feelings of insignificance. George Simmel's work has addressed the issue of how the "dissociation typical of modern city life, the freeing of the person from traditional social ties as from each other" can lead to a "loss or diminution of individuality." Moreover, when a person feels like "...just another face in the crowd, an object of indifference to strangers", it can "lead to feelings of insignificance..."

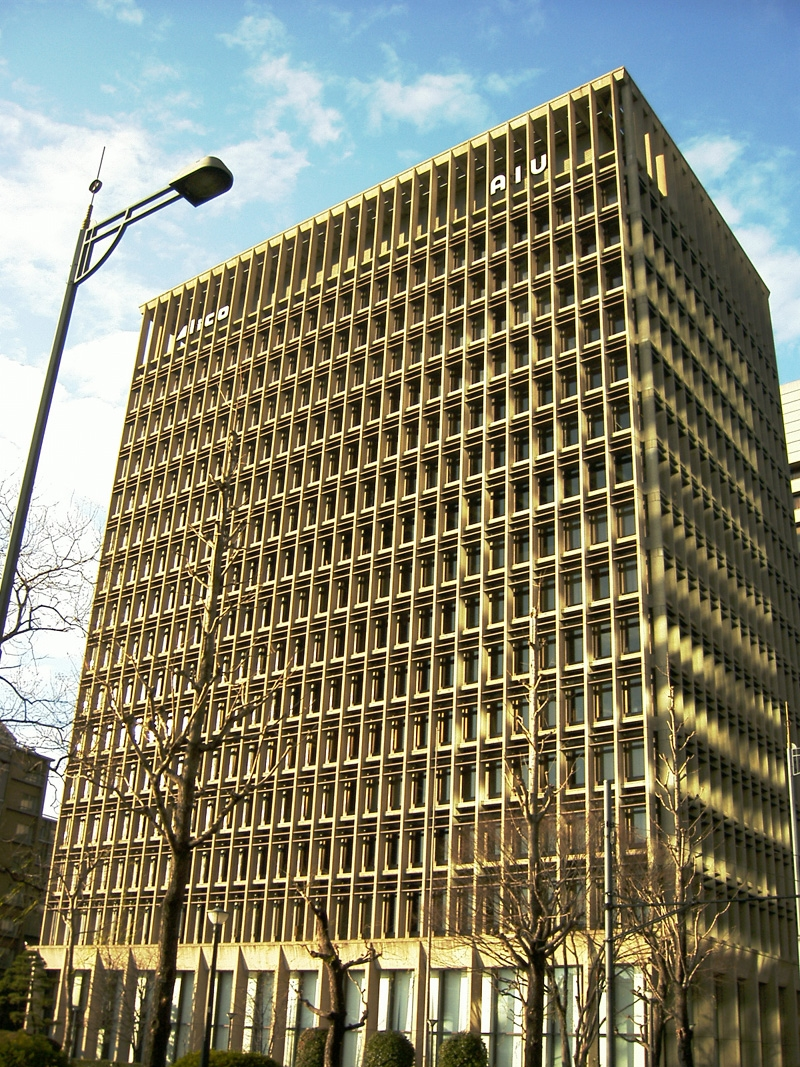
White-collar workers in large, bureaucratic organizations may feel like insignificant parts of a machine.

Individuals working in large, bureaucratic organizations who do not have "concrete evidence of success" may have "feelings of insignificance, disillusionment, and helplessness, which are the hallmarks of burnout. Some people in bureaucratic jobs who lack meaningful tasks, and who feel that institutional mechanisms or obstacles prevent them from receiving official recognition for their efforts, may also face boreout.

People facing an acute depression constantly have "[g]uiltiness and insignificance feelings". People facing issues of inferiority, due to the subjective, global, and judgmental self-appraisal that they are deficient may also have feelings of insignificance.

In the book The Fear of Insignificance, psychologist Carlo Strenger "...diagnoses the wide-spread fear of the global educated class of leading insignificant lives." Strenger warns "...that the global celebrity culture is adding fuel to the 'fear of insignificance' by undermining one's self-image and sense of self-worth." He noted that "...over recent years people around the world have been suffering from an increasing fear of their own 'insignificance'." He argues that the "impact of the global infotainment network on the individual is to blame," because it has led to the creation of "a new species...homo globalis – global man." In this new system, people "...are defined by our intimate connection to the global infotainment network, which has turned ranking and rating people on scales of wealth and celebrity into an obsession."

Strenger states that "...as humans we naturally measure ourselves to those around us, but now that we live in a "global village" we are comparing ourselves with the most "significant" [celebrity] people in the world, and finding ourselves wanting." He notes that "...in the past being a lawyer or doctor was a very reputable profession, but in this day and age, even high achievers constantly fear that they are insignificant when they compare themselves to [celebrity] success stories in the media. Strenger claims that this "...creates highly unstable self-esteem and an unstable society."

Alain de Botton describes some of the same issues in his book Status Anxiety. Botton's book examines people's anxiety about whether they are judged a success or a failure. De Botton claims that chronic anxiety about status is an inevitable side effect of any democratic, ostensibly egalitarian society.

Edith Wharton stated that "It is less mortifying to believe one's self unpopular than insignificant, and vanity prefers to assume that indifference is a latent form of unfriendliness." Leo Tolstoy wrote that "If you once realize that to-morrow, if not to-day, you will die and nothing will be left of you, everything becomes insignificant!"

== In philosophy ==
Blaise Pascal emphasized "the apparent insignificance of human existence, the "...dread of an unknown future", and the "...experience of being dominated by political and natural forces that far exceed our limited powers"; these elements "strike a chord of recognition with some of the existentialist writings that emerged in Europe following the Second World War."

Erich Fromm states that in modern capitalist societies, people develop a "...feeling of personal insignificance and powerlessness" due to "...economic recessions, global wars and terrorism." Fromm argues that in capitalist societies, the "...individual became subordinated to capitalist production and worked for profit's sake, for the development of new investment capital and for conspicuous spending." In making people "...work for extrapersonal ends," capitalism made people into a "servant to the very machine he built" and caused feelings of insignificance to arise.

== Sociological perspectives on insignificance ==
Across the social sciences, feelings of insignificance are analysed as patterned responses to status loss, misrecognition, and unmet moral expectations within modern societies. In work on the "moral grammar" of social life, Honneth argues that experiences of disrespect—ranging from the denial of rights to the devaluation of ways of life—undermine the forms of recognition on which self-respect depends, generating emotions such as shame, powerlessness, and insignificance . Lamont's comparative interviews with American and French workers likewise show that threats to dignity in workplaces and public life lead individuals to draw strong symbolic boundaries against groups perceived to deny them moral worth, a dynamic she identifies as central to preserving or recovering a sense of significance .

Other theorists emphasise how large-scale transformations can heighten vulnerability to insignificance. Arjun Appadurai links "fear of small numbers" to anxieties about cultural diminution under conditions of globalisation, arguing that majorities often experience symbolic shrinkage and status fragility that take emotional form as humiliation or insignificance . Evelin Lindner similarly contends that humiliation is a socially generated emotion produced when actors perceive that their equal dignity has been denied; because humiliation assaults the person's moral status, its proximate subjective experience is frequently one of insignificance .

Within U.S. political sociology, several authors analyse how such emotions become politically mobilised. Cramer's account of "rural consciousness" shows that many rural Wisconsinites interpret political and economic marginalisation through a lens of being overlooked and devalued, a structure of feeling that closely overlaps with insignificance . Hochschild, in both *Strangers in Their Own Land* and *Stolen Pride*, documents how communities experiencing downward mobility, cultural displacement, and moral disorientation articulate a narrative of undeserved shame and lost dignity; these affective interpretations both express felt insignificance and render people receptive to what she terms "liquid politics" and dignity-restoring appeals .

Across these accounts, sociologists frequently describe these patterns under related concepts such as "dignity politics," "recognition struggles," and "status loss." Although differing in emphasis, each perspective treats feelings of insignificance not as idiosyncratic psychological states but as socially patterned responses to structural change, symbolic devaluation, and contested hierarchies of worth.

== In religion ==
Martin Luther believed that the solution to the feelings of insignificance felt by the common person "...was to accept individual insignificance, to submit, to give up individual will and strength and hope to become acceptable to God."

== In relation to awe ==
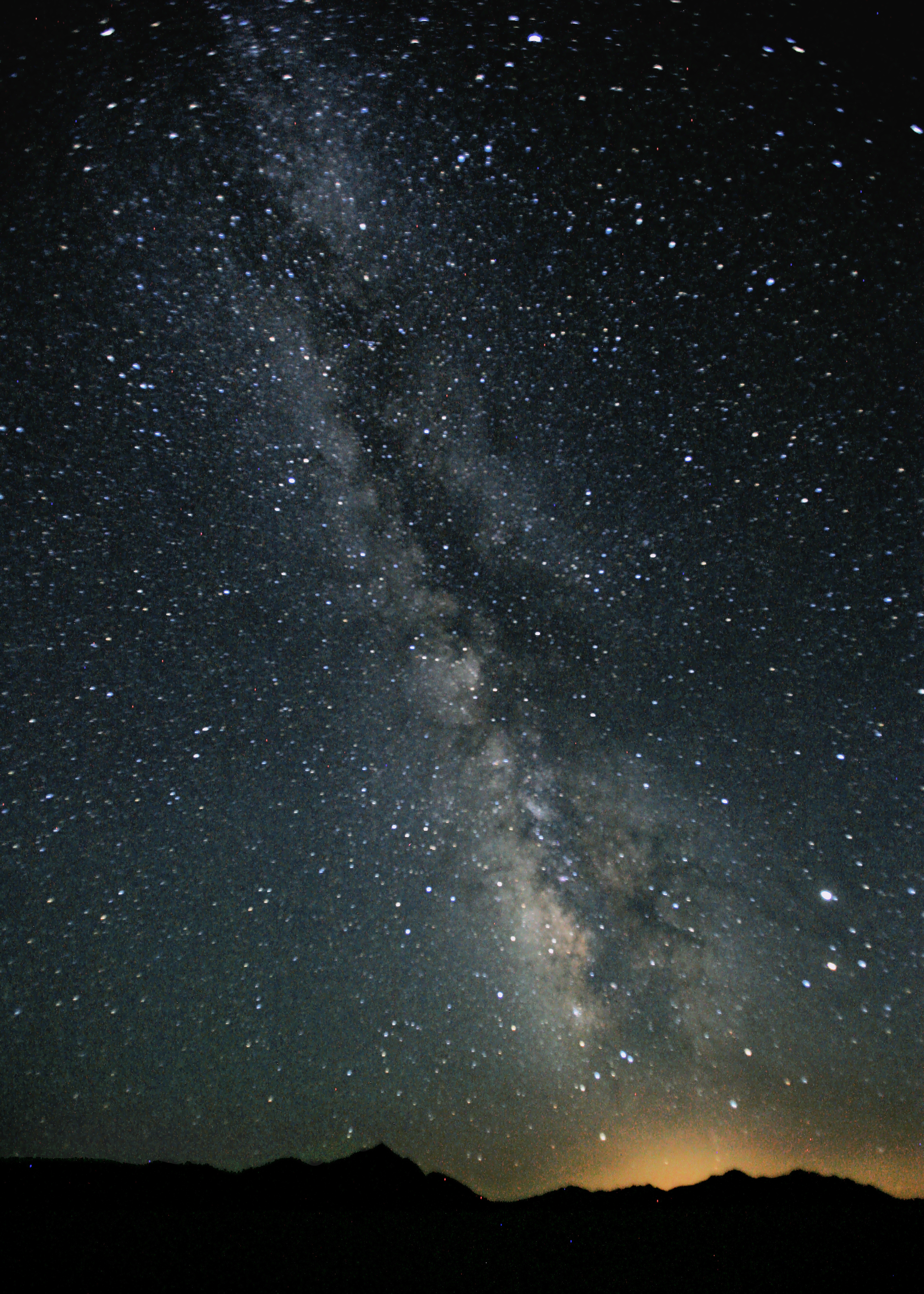
A person viewing the Milky Way from a non-light polluted area (the Black Rock Desert, Nevada) may feel awe-struck and insignificant.

A person who is in awe of a monumental natural wonder, such as a massive mountain peak or waterfall, may feel insignificant. Awe is an emotion comparable to wonder but less joyous, and more fearful or respectful. Awe is defined in Robert Plutchik's Wheel of emotions as a combination of surprise and fear. One dictionary definition is "an overwhelming feeling of reverence, admiration, fear, etc., produced by that which is grand, sublime, extremely powerful, or the like: in awe of God; in awe of great political figures". In general awe is directed at objects considered to be more powerful than the subject, such as the breaking of huge waves on the base of a rocky cliff, the thundering roar of a massive waterfall, the Great Pyramid of Giza, the Grand Canyon, or the vastness of open space in the cosmos (e.g., the overview effect).

In her column in Scientific American, Jennifer Ouellette referred to the vastness of the cosmos:

If one embraces an atheist worldview, it necessarily requires embracing, even celebrating, one's insignificance. It's a tall order, I know, when one is accustomed to being the center of attention. The universe existed in all its vastness before I was born, and it will exist and continue to evolve after I am gone. But knowing that doesn't make me feel bleak or hopeless. I find it strangely comforting.

== In literary philosophy ==
The concept of "insignificance" is also important to the literary philosophy of cosmicism. One of the prominent themes in cosmicism is the utter insignificance of humanity. H. P. Lovecraft believed that "the human race will disappear. Other races will appear and disappear in turn. The sky will become icy and void, pierced by the feeble light of half-dead stars. Which will also disappear. Everything will disappear."

Colin Wilson criticizes "the sense of defeat, or disaster, or futility, that seems to underlie so much...20th century literature", and its tendency "...to portray human existence as insignificant and futile." Wilson "...calls this affliction the "fallacy of insignificance", and as he explains in The Stature of Man this fallacy is unconsciously embedded in the psychology of the modern individual." Wilson argues that the "other-directed individual...is the typical person found in our modern society today and is a victim of the "fallacy of insignificance"." He claims that the "...other directed individual has been conditioned by society to lack self-confidence in their ability to achieve anything of real worth, and thus they conform to society to escape their feelings of unimportance and uselessness."

== See also ==
- Apathy
- Cannon fodder
- The Festival of Insignificance

== Bibliography ==
=== Books ===
- Appadurai, Arjun (2006). Fear of Small Numbers: An Essay on the Geography of Anger. Duke University Press. ISBN 9780822338635.
- Corey, Gerald (2011). Theory and Practice of Group Counseling. Cengage Learning. ISBN 9781111301552.
- Cramer, Katherine J. (2016). The Politics of Resentment: Rural Consciousness in Wisconsin and the Rise of Scott Walker. University of Chicago Press. ISBN 9780226349114.
- Hochschild, Arlie Russell (2016). Strangers in Their Own Land: Anger and Mourning on the American Right. The New Press. ISBN 9781620973493.
- Hochschild, Arlie Russell (2024). Stolen Pride: Loss, Shame, and the Rise of the Right. New York: The New Press. ISBN 9781620978245. Hochschild offers an ethnographic account of how "stolen pride" narratives function as gateways to right-wing authoritarian identification.
- Honneth, Axel (1995). The Struggle for Recognition: The Moral Grammar of Social Conflicts. Polity Press. ISBN 978-0262581479.
- Houellebecq, Michel (1999). H. P. Lovecraft: Against the World, Against Life. Creation Books. ISBN 978-2374950846.
- Lamont, Michèle (2000). The Dignity of Working Men: Morality and the Boundaries of Race, Class, and Immigration. New York and Cambridge, MA: Russell Sage Foundation and Harvard University Press. ISBN 9780674009929. Based on comparative interviews with U.S. and French workers, this study shows how working-class men draw moral boundaries and defend their dignity amid deindustrialization and cultural stigma.
- Lindner, Evelin (2006). Making Enemies: Humiliation and International Conflict. Praeger. ISBN 978-0275991098.
- Tonkiss, Fran (2005). Space, the City and Social Theory. Polity. ISBN 978-0745628264.

=== Journals / Web / News ===
- Clarke, Desmond (2007). "Blaise Pascal". Stanford Encyclopedia of Philosophy.
- "The Emotion Test". Cognisess.com. 2011.
- "Celeb Craze Fuels Fear of Insignificance". IndianExpress.com. 2011.
- Keltner, Dacher; Haidt, Jonathan (2003). "Approaching awe, a moral, spiritual, and aesthetic emotion" (PDF). Cognition and Emotion. 17: 297–314.
- Newman, Meredith A.; Mastracci, Sharon; Guy, Mary E. (2005). Burnout versus Making a Difference. American Political Science Association Annual Meeting.
- Plutchik, Robert (2001). "The Nature of Emotions". American Scientist. Archived from the original on July 16, 2001.
- Ouellette, Jennifer (2011). "In Praise of Insignificance". Scientific American.
- Shaw, J.A. (2000). "Narcissism as a motivational structure: the problem of personal significance". Psychiatry. 63 (3): 219–230.
- Thompson, Karl (2016). "Erich Fromm's 'Fear of Freedom' — Summary". Revise Sociology.
- "Acute Depression". Total-Health-Care.com. 2014. Archived from the original on 2015-10-03.
- "Self esteem". www-nehc.med.navy.mil. US Navy. 2011. Archived from the original on 2011-03-13.
- Werder, Peter (2007). "A New Phenomenon at Work: Boreout!" (PDF). Archived from the original (PDF) on 2021-04-25.
