= Politics of dignity =

Sociological, philosophical and cultural analyses

The politics of dignity (Spanish: la política de la dignidad; French: la politique de la dignité; Arabic: سياسة الكرامة siyāsat al-karāma) refers to a set of sociological, philosophical, and cultural analyses that examine how claims to dignity—and violations of it through humiliation or misrecognition—shape collective behavior, political mobilization, and institutional life. Though the term includes “politics,” its use extends across anthropology, social theory, affect studies, literary criticism, and normative philosophy. Building on arguments such as Charles Taylor’s account of equal dignity as a modern political value and misrecognition as a social harm, scholars explore how dignity-based grievances emerge when individuals or groups perceive their worth, status, or belonging to be denied. These frameworks have been applied to contexts ranging from populist resentment and authoritarian grievance-crafting to decolonial and postcolonial movements, where dignity serves as a central organizing principle for demands for recognition or structural justice.

Scholars note that the politics of dignity intersects with, but is not reducible to, the politics of resentment or grievance politics. Whereas grievance-based frameworks emphasize perceived slights, injustices, or status injuries, the politics of dignity focuses on claims for the restoration, protection, or recognition of a group’s social or moral standing. In this context the term is normatively neutral, that is, as a descriptive analytic category rather than a judgment about the moral worth of any particular use of dignity claims. Appeals to dignity can be mobilized on behalf of pluralistic, egalitarian, or emancipatory movements, but they can also be activated within exclusionary, nationalist, or authoritarian projects. Because perceived violations of dignity often take the form of collective resentments or humiliations, dignity-centered appeals frequently overlap with grievance narratives, even as they serve different political aims.

== Origins and Definitions ==
Clockwise from upper left: Kiev March of Dignity (2015);    Madrid Marchas de la Dignidad (2014);  Tahrir Square, Arab Spring (2011);    U.S. Civil Rights March (1963).  

   

   

   

   

Historical antecedents of the politics of dignity appear across a wide range of ancient, classical, and medieval settings, where communities mobilized against practices they experienced as degrading or humiliating. From the 5th century BCE Roman Plebeian Secessions challenged debt-bondage and political exclusion as forms of indignitas, demanding institutions that would protect civic standing. Enslaved people involved in the Servile Wars—most famously the rebellion led by Spartacus—framed their struggle as a refusal of the social death imposed by enslavement, and later historians often interpret the movement as a collective claim to human dignity. In early Christianity, communities similarly rejected prevailing hierarchies, granting equal ritual standing to slaves, women, and the poor and condemning practices that subjected believers to public shame. In South Asia, the edicts of Emperor Ashoka (3rd century BCE) articulated one of the earliest known dignity-based governance frameworks, with edicts articulating a political ethic founded on compassion, pluralism, and respect for the dignity of all persons regardless of religious or social group. Medieval Europe produced parallel developments: in Florence, the Ciompi revolt of 1378 protested the occupational dishonor and political exclusion imposed on textile workers. Confucian political culture in China likewise linked legitimate rule to the avoidance of humiliating governance, and uprisings such as the Yellow Turban Rebellion expressed grievances against officials who subjected commoners to degrading treatment. In the Islamic world, movements grounded in concepts of karāma (saintly moral authority and honor) often mobilized against forms of arbitrary rule seen as violating the community’s moral standing. In nineteenth-century Algeria, Rahmaniyya-linked revolts such as the 1845 Dahra uprising and the 1849 Za‘atsha insurrection denounced French and Ottoman policies that subjected Muslims to ritualized humiliation, including indiscriminate taxation and punitive assaults on local communities. Sufi figures like Bu Maʿza and Bu Ziyān derived part of their authority from widely recognized miraculous charisma (karāma), which rebels interpreted as legitimizing resistance to degrading rule. These uprisings framed collective action as a struggle to end humiliation and restore communal honor, a sentiment repeatedly noted in contemporary accounts.

Across these contexts, communities responded to systems that denied proper moral standing or imposed ritualized humiliation, and scholars frequently interpret such uprisings as early forms of dignity-centered collective action that contribute to a broader premodern lineage for later egalitarian and pluralist movements.

Scherto R. Gill, a scholar of relational ethics characterizes the politics of dignity as a framework that takes dignity—understood as both the equal intrinsic worth of persons and the relational conditions of communal well-being—as the ethical core of just political and institutional design. In broader scholarship, the politics of dignity names a set of analytical perspectives concerned with how power orders status, respect, and personhood. Status-theoretic accounts emphasize struggles for equal standing in contexts where groups experience systematic diminishment or exclusion, a theme also central to the politics of "equal status" identified by Jeffrey Flynn, a theorist of status equality. Zaynab El Bernoussi defines dignity politics as emerging from historically specific contests over humiliation, domination, and recognition in postcolonial states—especially where dignity is material, political, and spiritual at once. Other frameworks highlight the diagnostic role of humiliation, degradation, and dehumanization as concrete markers of violated dignity, using these harms to analyze institutional and structural injustice.

== Postcolonial and Racialized Dignity Politics ==
In postcolonial contexts, scholars note that demands for dignity frequently arise from the lived experience of domination, humiliation, and political exclusion. El Bernoussi argues that such claims constitute a distinct “politics of dignity,” in which communities respond to the enduring legacies of colonial rule and the socioeconomic inequalities that continue to shape their conditions of life, as seen in both the 1956 Suez nationalization and the 2011 Egyptian Revolution. She describes this dynamic as “dignition,” a hybrid need for material security, social worth, and the restoration of political voice, through which marginalized groups seek to reclaim authorship over their own narratives and institutions. Within this broader lineage, African American political thought has generated its own traditions of dignity politics grounded in the struggle against racialized domination. Political theorist Nicholas Buccola contends that Frederick Douglass placed human dignity at the center of democratic agency, holding that formerly enslaved people could realize their personhood only through public action, collective self-assertion, and participation in an egalitarian political community. Buccola similarly interprets James Baldwin as advancing a politics of dignity rooted in truth-telling and moral confrontation, arguing that democratic renewal requires exposing the myths that sustain racial hierarchy and affirming the intrinsic worth of those rendered dehumanizable within it.

== Dignity in Political Movements ==
=== In Pluralist / Egalitarian Politics ===
Many egalitarian and pluralist social movements do not treat dignity as a passive ideal or long-term aspiration, but rather as a practical resource for sustaining large and heterogeneous coalitions under conditions of repression, risk, or rapid social change. By framing collective grievances in terms of dignity and respect, organizers create a shared moral vocabulary that helps translate anger, humiliation, or marginalization into disciplined and coordinated collective action. This dignity-centered approach enables cooperation among participants with divergent political, cultural, or social backgrounds — often allowing trade-unionists, religious groups, intellectuals, and youth activists to unite under a common cause. In the movements discussed below, dignity has functioned not only as a normative commitment but as an emotional and organizational anchor: a constraint on retaliatory violence, a stabilizing grammar for internal disagreement, and a bridge across ideological divides.

Scholars of nonviolent movements note that both Martin Luther King Jr. and Mohandas Gandhi relied on dignity-centered forms of emotional discipline to sustain cooperation among participants with divergent ideological commitments. In analyses of the U.S. civil rights movement, King’s workshops on nonviolence and the Southern Christian Leadership Conference’s training programs are described as methods for transforming anger at segregation into disciplined collective action grounded in the "dignity and worth of all human personality," which helped prevent splintering between militant and moderate factions. Similarly, studies of Gandhian nonviolence argue that satyagraha required activists to adopt norms of self-respect, restraint, and non-humiliating conduct, functioning as a system of emotional regulation that held together a movement encompassing religious, caste, and ideological diversity. Historical accounts emphasize that Gandhi’s insistence on treating opponents without humiliation was also directed inward, serving as an integrative norm that reduced factional conflict within India’s nationalist movement.

Scholars of Polish Solidarity argue that dignity served as a crucial form of emotional regulation for a movement that had to coordinate workers, Catholic networks, secular intellectuals, and competing opposition factions under conditions of sustained repression. Analyses of Solidarity’s internal practices describe its emphasis on godność (“dignity”) and civic respect as a way of transforming anger at state coercion into disciplined collective action, reducing the likelihood of factional escalation or retaliatory violence that could fracture the coalition. Historians note that appeals to civic dignity provided a shared moral vocabulary capable of bridging ideological divides within the opposition, stabilizing cooperation between trade union militants and more cautious reformist currents. Studies of Solidarity’s 1980–81 mobilization further emphasize that the movement’s ethos of respectful internal deliberation acted as a protective emotional grammar, helping maintain unity even as state authorities sought to exacerbate internal tensions.

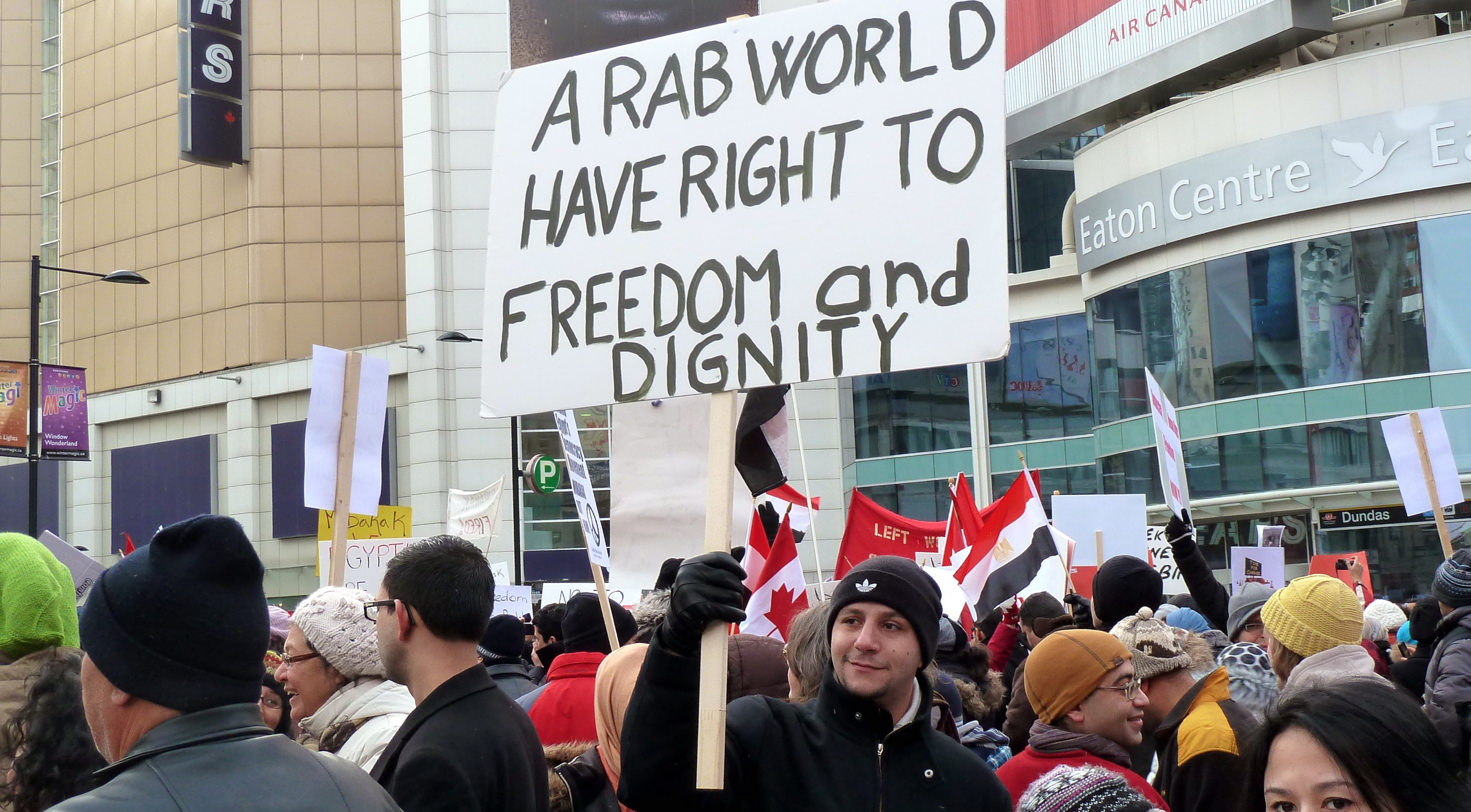
Rally in support of Arab Spring, Toronto (2011)

Scholars analyzing the anti-apartheid struggle argue that dignity functioned as a core form of emotional regulation that helped maintain cooperation across South Africa’s ideologically diverse resistance networks, including church groups, civic organizations, trade unions, and political movements. In this literature, the ethic of ubuntu is described as a relational dignity principle that encouraged activists to restrain retaliatory anger and to frame resistance in ways that could sustain broad interracial and inter-factional participation under high-risk conditions. Historians further note that appeals to shared dignity operated as a stabilizing emotional grammar that reduced internal fracturing and allowed cooperation between radical, moderate, and legal-advocacy wings of the anti-apartheid coalition. Comparable dynamics appear in analyses of the 2011 Arab Spring, where karāma (“dignity”) is identified as a central mobilizing emotion that transformed experiences of routine authoritarian humiliation into disciplined mass protest. Studies of Tunisia and Egypt emphasize that calls for dignity helped coordinate participation across secular, Islamist, leftist, and unaffiliated groups, providing a shared moral frame that mitigated internal tensions during rapidly escalating protest cycles.

=== Authoritarian, Populist, and Strongman Politics ===
Scholars of fascism and authoritarianism have long noted that movements such as Nazism did not begin with openly supremacist appeals for broad audiences but with a rhetoric of injured collective dignity. Historian Robert O. Paxton’s influential definition of fascism emphasizes an “obsessive preoccupation with community decline, humiliation, or victimhood” combined with promises of national renewal and restored honor, a pattern that fits early Nazi propaganda about undoing the “humiliation” of Versailles and reclaiming Germany’s stolen status. In this reading, slogans that “we were humiliated,” “our pride was stolen,” or “we deserve respect again” are not incidental but form the emotional gateway through which later, more explicitly racist and expansionist projects are legitimated.

Drawing on comparative cases, Jason Stanley argues that exclusionary dignity politics operates by manufacturing sharp boundaries between “us” and “them,” converting perceived slights or losses of status into a hierarchical political identity. In this framework, appeals to national victimhood and cultural decline function as rhetorical devices that transform feelings of indignity into support for authoritarian projects of purity and order. Comparative work on contemporary “strongman” leaders argues that similar dignity-inflected narratives recur across twentieth- and twenty-first-century authoritarian and exclusionary projects. Ruth Ben-Ghiat’s study of strongmen from Mussolini to Trump describes how such leaders “don the cloak of national victimhood, reliving the humiliations of their people by foreign powers” while presenting themselves as the only figures able to restore lost greatness, binding followers through a mix of grievance, nostalgia and promised redemption. Ivan Krastev and Stephen Holmes likewise interpret the post-1989 turn toward illiberal nationalism in parts of Eastern Europe and Russia as driven by resentment at perceived second-class status and “humiliating” imitation of the West, making appeals to wounded national dignity central to the legitimation of new authoritarian elites. Political theorist John Keane generalizes this pattern in his analysis of populism, arguing that moments of mass support for demagogues arise when people who feel “dropped” or humiliated rally to leaders who promise to restore their dignity and punish those blamed for their fall.

Recent work on the “politics of dignity” connects these authoritarian uses of humiliation rhetoric with broader global trends. Francis Fukuyama proposes that early-twenty-first-century politics is increasingly organized around demands for recognition of dignity, and he explicitly notes that the same dynamic he terms the thymotic drive can power both egalitarian movements for inclusion and nationalist or religious projects that promise to restore a disrespected majority’s honor. Arlie Russell Hochschild’s Stolen Pride: Loss, Shame, and the Rise of the Right provides an ethnographic account of how US right-wing voters interpret economic and cultural change as an undeserved loss of pride, embracing leaders who frame themselves as champions of “looked-down-on” communities; commentators have drawn on her work to argue that appeals to stolen dignity function as a bridge between status anxiety and support for authoritarian-leaning politics. Michèle Lamont describes a similar dynamic that emerges from workers’ efforts to defend their worth through moral boundary work that differentiates “people like us” from stigmatizing or devaluing groups. This boundary-drawing—frequently an unintended consequence of seeking respect—enables marginalized groups to assert moral status against cultural hierarchies that equate socioeconomic position with worth. Zembylas observes that affective appeals grounded in resentment, shame, and perceived cultural displacement form an important substrate of modern authoritarian populism, allowing leaders to legitimise exclusionary projects by framing themselves as champions of a humiliated people seeking recovered dignity.

In a different regional context, Zaynab El Bernoussi’s analysis of Arab uprisings conceptualizes the “politics of dignity” (karama) as a “catch-all” demand that can be appropriated by very different actors, showing how claims to have restored or defended collective dignity can legitimize both democratic and authoritarian projects. Complementary work on humiliation as a political technique—such as by Ute Frevert’s or Michalinos Zembylas underscores that perceived public humiliation, whether by foreign powers or domestic elites, is a powerful resource for movements that promise to restore respect, and that this dynamic has been visible both in anti-authoritarian revolts and in the rise of new forms of authoritarian nationalism. In his examination of right wing populism in the US, Zembylas similarly observes that affective appeals grounded in resentment, shame, and perceived cultural displacement form an important substrate of modern authoritarian populism, allowing leaders to legitimise exclusionary projects by framing themselves as champions of a humiliated people seeking recovered dignity.

== Theoretical Frameworks ==
Modern accounts of dignity often begin by contrasting hierarchical societies, in which dignity marked a privileged rank, with the emergence of a universal status attributed to all persons. In this transition, dignity ceases to be an aristocratic distinction and becomes a general principle of equal moral standing, informing the legal and political orders of modern democratic polities. Charles Taylor similarly argues that the shift from “honor” to “equal dignity” is a defining feature of modern identity, grounding claims for inclusion, respect, and cultural recognition across diverse populations. Jeffrey Flynn extends this analysis by showing how dignity becomes a normative baseline in what he calls “single-status” societies, where expectations of institutional fairness and protections against suffering presuppose equal standing for all persons. Together, these frameworks establish dignity as a universal moral and political value whose modern form is inseparable from claims about status equality.

Capability-based approaches theorize dignity not principally as a status or recognition claim, but as a threshold of substantive freedoms that must be secured for people to lead lives worthy of their humanity. Martha Nussbaum argues that political communities violate dignity when material, social, or institutional conditions prevent individuals from developing and exercising central human capabilities such as bodily integrity, practical reason, or affiliation. On this view, dignity imposes affirmative obligations on states: they must cultivate the conditions under which people can actually do and be certain things, rather than merely respecting their formal rights. Capability theorists therefore treat dignity as a metric for evaluating institutional arrangements—focusing on how policies expand or impede real opportunities for flourishing, especially for those facing entrenched deprivation or structural discrimination.

Recognition-theoretic approaches treat dignity as inseparable from the social conditions that enable persons to appear as equal participants in shared forms of life. Axel Honneth argues that self-confidence, self-respect, and self-esteem are intersubjectively acquired and depend on relations of love, legal respect, and social solidarity that secure the prerequisites for individual identity-formation. Experiences of disrespect are therefore not merely psychological injuries but violations of normative expectations embedded in social interaction, motivating struggles aimed at expanding the patterns of recognition necessary for autonomy. Nancy Fraser, by contrast, reframes misrecognition as a matter of institutionalized status subordination: cultural value patterns that mark some groups as inferior impede their capacity to participate as peers in social life. On her "status model," recognition claims are justified when institutional norms deny the intersubjective conditions of participatory parity and must be remedied by transforming those norms rather than appealing to subjective self-realization. Flynn extends these insights by emphasizing how modern "single-status" societies treat equal standing as a background expectation, such that failures of recognition manifest not only as inequality but as forms of suffering that violate the dignity owed to persons as moral equals.

Structural and institutional perspectives emphasize how patterns of domination, degradation, or rank abuse undermine the standing owed to persons within social and civic life. Robert Fuller’s analysis of "rankism" frames abuses of hierarchical authority as violations of dignity that recur across workplaces, schools, health systems, and political institutions, identifying them as wrongful assertions of rank that corrode the moral equality of those subjected to them. Fuller argues that naming such abuses enables collective resistance and provides a conceptual lens for understanding diverse indignities as sharing a common structure. Avishai Margalit adds that the hallmark of an indecent society is not inequality as such but the presence of institutions that systematically humiliate—by denying autonomy, degrading embodied identity markers, or rendering people dependent on arbitrary benevolence. For Margalit, humiliation is a more concrete and observable social injury than dignity itself, supplying an empirical diagnostic for evaluating political and institutional harms. Flynn integrates these insights by arguing that modern “single-status” societies treat non-humiliating treatment and equal standing as baseline expectations, such that institutionalized indignities are experienced as violations of a shared moral order.

Regardless of the political goals they are applied to, discursive and affective approaches to dignity politics emphasize how collective identities are assembled, mobilized, and emotionally intensified through rhetorical, symbolic, and psychological mechanisms. Ernesto Laclau argues that popular identities arise through the articulation of heterogeneous social demands into chains of equivalence unified under “floating signifiers,” a process by which “the people” is constructed as a political subject. These logics of equivalence and difference explain how dignity grievances—varied in origin—can be condensed into a single antagonistic frontier between “the people” and an elite. George Lakoff adds that political worldviews draw on deep metaphorical frames rooted in moral models, such that appeals to dignity activate tacit assumptions about authority, reciprocity, and the moral status of groups. Sara Ahmed’s theory of “affective economies” explains how emotions such as pride, hurt, and humiliation circulate within communities, binding subjects together through shared orientations and histories of injury. More recently, Zembylas argues that right-wing populist movements amplify indignation, shame, and ressentiment by transforming emotional pain into political attachment, making dignity claims central to their affective appeal.

== Emotions, Affect, and Group Dynamics ==
A growing body of scholarship highlights how dignity politics is grounded in shared emotional processes that transform perceived status loss into political identification. Hochschild’s analysis of "deep stories" demonstrates how communities interpret economic and cultural displacement as collective humiliation, generating what she terms a “pride economy” through which emotional rewards and injuries circulate. Michael Kimmel’s concept of "aggrieved entitlement" extends this account by showing how many men can feel a profound loss of respect and status in a new, multicultural, and more egalitarian world. The pain of this change is felt as a profound dignity injury, producing cycles of humiliation, shame, and resentment that are intensified in online "manosphere" subcultures. Michalinos Zembylas situates these emotions within broader “affective economies” of right-wing populism, arguing that shame and perceived indignity are converted into ressentiment and redirected toward out-groups, enabling authoritarian leaders to present themselves as agents of dignity’s restoration. Together, these frameworks show how emotional interpretations of status loss—rather than ideology or material deprivation alone—play a central role in movements that promise recovered pride and recognition such as those that supported Modi, Trump, Chávez, Erdoğan, and Perón.

Political theorists Geoffrey Brennan and Philip Pettit argue that systems of esteem and disesteem operate as powerful social incentives, shaping individual behavior and collective norms through the desire to secure favorable regard and avoid public discredit. Their account emphasizes that esteem is inherently comparative and competitively scarce, creating social dynamics in which shifts in baseline expectations can heighten or diminish the perceived dignity injuries that motivate political mobilization.

== Critiques and Limitations ==
Many constitutions and legal instruments affirm a right to dignity in various formulations—for example, the German Basic Law (Art. 1), the Constitution of South Africa (s.10), and numerous post–World War II human rights instruments. While these enactments signal the centrality of dignity as a foundational legal value, scholars note persistent difficulties in translating such broad commitments into precise analytical or doctrinal standards. Comparative legal studies find that dignity is invoked to justify autonomy, equality, bodily integrity, social protection, and even community honor, sometimes within the same jurisprudential tradition, producing an unstable and highly elastic concept. Critics argue that because dignity can be used to support conflicting legal interpretations, it risks functioning like a floating signifier- what Jeremy Waldron describes as an “inexhaustible placeholder” for moral intuitions that remain unspecified.

Scholars have noted a tension between efforts to ground a “politics of dignity” in broad ethical or relational principles and the practical demands of legal and policy design. Some legal theorists advocate that as an alternative to the language of dignity, the specificity of humiliation as a distinct and socially recognizable injury is more practical for crafting laws and policy. An example of this argument may be found in Avishai Margalit’s book The Decent Society, where humiliation rather than abstract dignity is treated as the critical diagnostic category for evaluating political and institutional harms. Political theorists such as Samuel Harrison argue that dignity functions best as a flexible, relational value that can guide institutional reform and collective well-being. Other authors, including Philippe-André Rodriguez, counter that this very flexibility becomes a problem when dignity is used in courts or legislation, since legal systems require clearer and more stable definitions to prevent inconsistent or abusive interpretations. This disagreement highlights an unresolved debate about whether dignity should remain an open, evolving political ideal or be more tightly defined to support enforceable laws and rights protections.

Analysts in political theory and the social sciences also point out that dignity is not a culturally universal or semantically fixed category. Anthropologists and postcolonial theorists note that many social movements conceptualize worth and status through local moral grammars—such as *karāma* in Arabic-speaking societies, *izzat* in South Asia, or “face” in East Asian contexts—that only partially overlap with the liberal-individualist vocabulary embedded in Euro-American constitutional traditions. From this perspective, the use of “dignity” as a master analytic category may obscure rather than clarify how status, humiliation, respect, and recognition operate within different cultural and political settings. Scholars also warn that dignity-based explanation can blur distinctions between rights, recognition, and status inequality, and may collapse into tautology when invoked without clear normative or empirical specification. These debates caution that while dignity offers a powerful moral language, its indeterminacy and cultural variability impose limits on its usefulness as a general explanatory framework.

== Movements and Coalitions ==
- Revolution of Dignity (Ukraine)
- Person Dignity Theory (Vietnam)
- Movement for Dignity and Citizenship (Spain)
- Dignity Coalition (Tunisia)
- Dignity Movement (Lebanon)
- Dignity Party (Egypt)

== See also ==
- Human dignity
- Humiliation
- Recognition (sociology)
- Status anxiety
- Feeling rules
- Sociology of emotions
- Affect theory
- Politics of resentment

== Bibliography ==
=== Books ===
- Ahmed, Sara (2004). The Cultural Politics of Emotion. Edinburgh University Press. ISBN 978-0748691135.
- Asad, Talal (2003). Formations of the Secular: Christianity, Islam, Modernity. Stanford: Stanford University Press. ISBN 978-0804747684.
- Bayat, Asef (2013). Life as Politics: How Ordinary People Change the Middle East (2nd ed.). Stanford: Stanford University Press. ISBN 978-0804786331.
- Ben-Ghiat, Ruth (2020). Strongmen: Mussolini to the Present. New York: W.W. Norton. ISBN 9781324001546. Ben-Ghiat analyzes how authoritarian rulers mobilize narratives of national humiliation and promised dignity restoration.
- Bradley, Keith (1989). Slavery and Rebellion in the Roman World, 140 B.C.–70 B.C. Bloomington: Indiana University Press. ISBN 978-0253211699.
- Brennan, Geoffrey; Pettit, Philip (2004). The Economy of Esteem: An Essay on Civil and Political Society. Oxford: Oxford University Press. ISBN 9780199289813. A theoretical treatment of social esteem as a scarce good regulated by informal “markets,” showing how struggles over status and respect shape political behaviour and institutional design.
- Brown, Judith M. (1989). Gandhi: Prisoner of Hope. New Haven: Yale University Press. ISBN 978-0300051254.
- Buccola, Nicholas (2013). The Political Thought of Frederick Douglass: In Pursuit of American Liberty. New York: New York University Press. ISBN 978-1479867493.
- Buccola, Nicholas (2019). The Fire Is Upon Us: James Baldwin, William F. Buckley Jr., and the Debate over Race in America. Princeton: Princeton University Press. ISBN 978-0691181547.
- Chappell, David L. (2004). A Stone of Hope: Prophetic Religion and the Death of Jim Crow. Chapel Hill: University of North Carolina Press. ISBN 978-0807856604.
- Clancy-Smith, Julia A. (1994). Rebel and Saint: Muslim Notables, Populist Protest, Colonial Encounters (Algeria and Tunisia, 1800–1904). Berkeley: University of California Press. ISBN 978-0520920378.
- Clingman, Stephen (1998). Bram Fischer: Afrikaner Revolutionary. Amherst: University of Massachusetts Press. ISBN 978-1431407521.
- Cone, James H. (1991). Martin & Malcolm & America: A Dream or a Nightmare. Maryknoll, NY: Orbis Books. ISBN 978-1570759796.
- Davis, David Brion (2006). Inhuman Bondage: The Rise and Fall of Slavery in the New World. New York: Oxford University Press. ISBN 9780195339444.
- Flynn, Jeffrey (2020). "Suffering and Status". In Barnett, Michael N. (ed.). Humanitarianism and Human Rights: A World of Differences?. Human Rights in History. Cambridge: Cambridge University Press. pp. 49–70. doi:10.1017/9781108872485.003. ISBN 9781108836791.
- Fuller, Robert W. (2006). All Rise: Somebodies, Nobodies, and the Politics of Dignity. San Francisco: Berrett-Koehler Publishers. ISBN 9781576753859. Develops the notion of a “politics of dignity” aimed at overcoming rankism—the routine abuse of power attached to status—and sketches institutional reforms that would treat dignity as a basic political good.
- Fraser, Nancy; Honneth, Axel (2003). Redistribution or Recognition?: A Political–Philosophical Exchange. London: Verso. ISBN 9781859844922. A structured debate between Fraser and Honneth over whether social justice should be framed primarily in terms of economic redistribution or symbolic–status recognition, with implications for “dignity politics.”
- Frevert, Ute (2020). The Politics of Humiliation: A Modern History. Translated by Bresnahan, Adam. Oxford: Oxford University Press. ISBN 978-0-19-882031-4. This monograph provides Frevert’s full historical account of humiliation as a political and social technology, central to contemporary dignity-based political analysis.
- Fukuyama, Francis (2018a). "Chapter 1: The Politics of Dignity". Identity: The Demand for Dignity and the Politics of Resentment (PDF). New York: Farrar, Straus and Giroux. ISBN 9780374129293. Argues that modern “identity politics” across left and right is rooted in a universal demand for recognition and dignity, and connects this to contemporary nationalist and authoritarian movements.
- Garton Ash, Timothy (1999). The Polish Revolution: Solidarity. New Haven: Yale University Press. ISBN 9780300070668.
- Gill, Scherto R. (2025). "Politics of Dignity: Structural Justice for Collective Healing and Global Flourishing". In Gill, Scherto R. (ed.). New Perspectives on Healing Collective Trauma: Towards Social Justice and Communal Well-Being. London: Routledge. doi:10.4324/9781003613558-17. ISBN 9781041011804.
- Gutmann, Amy (1994). "Introduction". In Taylor, Charles (ed.). Multiculturalism: Examining the Politics of Recognition. Princeton University Press. pp. 3–7.
- Hawkins, Kirk A. (2010). Venezuela's Chavismo and Populism in Comparative Perspective. Cambridge: Cambridge University Press. ISBN 9780521765039.
- Honneth, Axel (1995). The Struggle for Recognition: The Moral Grammar of Social Conflicts. Cambridge: Polity Press. ISBN 9780745693323. Develops a recognitional theory of justice in which social conflicts are interpreted as struggles by individuals and groups to have their dignity and contributions socially affirmed.
- Hochschild, Arlie Russell (2016). Strangers in Their Own Land: Anger and Mourning on the American Right. The New Press. ISBN 9781620973493.
- Hochschild, Arlie Russell (2024a). Stolen Pride: Loss, Shame, and the Rise of the Right. New York: The New Press. ISBN 9781620978245. Hochschild offers an ethnographic account of how “stolen pride” narratives function as gateways to right-wing authoritarian identification.
- Horowitz, Joel (2012). "Populism and Its Legacies in Argentina". In Conniff, Michael L. (ed.). Populism in Latin America (2nd ed.). Tuscaloosa: University of Alabama Press. ISBN 9780817357092.
- Jaffrelot, Christophe (2021). Modi's India: Hindu Nationalism and the Rise of Ethnic Democracy. Princeton: Princeton University Press. ISBN 9780691206806.
- Kimmel, Michael (2013). Angry White Men: American Masculinity at the End of an Era. Nation Books. ISBN 9781568589619.
- Krastev, Ivan; Holmes, Stephen (2019). The Light That Failed: A Reckoning. New York: Pegasus Books. ISBN 978-1643133690. Krastev and Holmes tie the rise of illiberal nationalism to collective humiliation and dignity loss after the Cold War.
- Kubik, Jan (1994). The Power of Symbols Against the Symbols of Power: The Rise of Solidarity and the Fall of State Socialism in Poland. University Park: Pennsylvania State University Press. ISBN 978-0270776928.
- Laclau, Ernesto (2005). On Populist Reason. London: Verso. ISBN 9781859846513. Laclau’s major theoretical work arguing that populism arises when disparate social demands—often rooted in experiences of disrespect, humiliation, or denied dignity—are articulated into a common political identity.
- Lakoff, George (2016). Moral Politics: How Liberals and Conservatives Think. Chicago: University of Chicago Press. ISBN 978-0-226-41129-3. Uses cognitive–linguistic analysis of moral metaphors to explain why different camps experience policies as either affirming or affronting their dignity, respect and rightful place in the social order.
- Lamont, Michèle (2000). The Dignity of Working Men: Morality and the Boundaries of Race, Class, and Immigration. New York and Cambridge, MA: Russell Sage Foundation and Harvard University Press. ISBN 9780674009929. Based on comparative interviews with U.S. and French workers, this study shows how working-class men draw moral boundaries and defend their dignity amid deindustrialization and cultural stigma.
- Mahmood, Saba (2012). Politics of Piety: The Islamic Revival and the Feminist Subject. Princeton: Princeton University Press. ISBN 9780691149806.
- Margalit, Avishai (1996). The Decent Society. Cambridge, MA: Harvard University Press. ISBN 978-0674194373.
- Meeks, Wayne A. (1983). The First Urban Christians: The Social World of the Apostle Paul. New Haven: Yale University Press. ISBN 978-0300098617.
- Nandy, Ashis (1983). The Intimate Enemy: Loss and Recovery of Self Under Colonialism. Delhi: Oxford University Press. ISBN 978-0198062172.
- Norris, Pippa; Inglehart, Ronald (2019). Cultural Backlash: Trump, Brexit, and the Rise of Authoritarian-Populism. New York: Cambridge University Press. ISBN 9781108426077.
- Nussbaum, Martha C. (2011). Political Emotions: Why Love Matters for Justice. Cambridge, MA: Harvard University Press. ISBN 978-0-674-05054-9. Argues that stable, egalitarian democracies require cultivated public emotions—such as compassion and civic love—that sustain citizens’ sense of mutual respect and shared dignity.
- Ost, David (1990). Solidarity and the Politics of Anti-Politics: Opposition and Reform in Poland Since 1968. Philadelphia: Temple University Press. ISBN 978-0877229001.
- Parekh, Bhikhu (1989). Gandhi's Political Philosophy: A Critical Examination. London: Macmillan. ISBN 978-0333547656.
- Paxton, Robert O. (2004). The Anatomy of Fascism. New York: Alfred A. Knopf. ISBN 978-0307428127. This is the most widely cited scholarly source defining fascism as driven by perceived humiliation and a promise of restored dignity.
- Sandel, Michael J. (2020). The Tyranny of Merit: What's Become of the Common Good?. New York: Farrar, Straus and Giroux. ISBN 978-0-141-99118-4. Analysis of the “politics of humiliation” and emphasis on the “dignity of work” illustrate how modern political movements transform perceived injuries to dignity into resentment-driven demands for restored status.
- Stanley, Jason (2018). How Fascism Works: The Politics of Us and Them. New York: Random House. ISBN 9780525511854. Dissects the rhetorical and affective repertoire of fascist politics—mythic past, victimized “us”, demonized “them”—and shows how they weaponize humiliation, status anxiety and wounded dignity.
- Taylor, Charles (1994). Taylor, Charles; Gutmann, Amy (eds.). Multiculturalism: Examining the Politics of Recognition. Princeton, NJ: Princeton University Press. ISBN 9780691037790. This multi author volume includes Charles Taylor's seminal essay on the “politics of recognition” with responses by other noted theorists such as Jürgen Habermas, debating when and how states should acknowledge cultural identities to secure citizens’ equal dignity.
- Tutu, Desmond (1999). No Future Without Forgiveness. New York: Image. ISBN 9780385496902.
- Urbainczyk, Theresa (2004). Spartacus. London: Duckworth. ISBN 978-1853996689.
- Waldron, Jeremy (2012). Dignity, Rank, and Rights. Oxford: Oxford University Press. ISBN 9780199915439.
- Zembylas, Michalinos (2021). Affect and the Rise of Right-Wing Populism: Pedagogies for the Renewal of Democratic Education. Palgrave Macmillan. ISBN 978-1108978897.

=== Articles ===
- Anderson, Lisa (2011). "Demystifying the Arab Spring". Foreign Affairs. 90 (3): 2–7.
- El Bernoussi, Zaynab (2014a). "Postcolonial Politics of Dignity: The Case of Morocco". Journal of North African Studies. 20 (2): 231–249. doi:10.1080/13629387.2014.975665. El Bernoussi conceptualizes dignity as a flexible political currency usable by democratic and authoritarian actors alike.
- El Bernoussi, Zaynab (2014b). "The postcolonial politics of dignity: From the 1956 Suez nationalization to the 2011 Revolution in Egypt". International Sociology. 30 (4): 368–379. doi:10.1177/0268580914537848.
- El Bernoussi, Zakia (2015). "Dignity as a Political Virtue in the Arab Spring". Middle East Law and Governance. 7 (1): 1–30. doi:10.1163/18763375-00701003.
- El Bernoussi, Zaynab (2022). "Dignity as a Political Value in the Egyptian Revolution". Middle East Law and Governance. 14 (1): 1–27.
- Frevert, Ute (2017). "Die Politik der Demütigung: Schauplätze von Macht und Ohnmacht" [The Politics of Humiliation: Stages of Power and Powerlessness] (PDF). Translated by Clarke, Stephen. Goethe-Institut. pp. 7–24. This English translation excerpt outlines Frevert’s historical framework on humiliation as a political technique, directly relevant to dignity-based mobilization and authoritarian dynamics.
- Fukuyama, Francis (2018-08-14). "Against Identity Politics: The New Tribalism and the Crisis of Democracy" (PDF). Foreign Affairs. 97 (5): 90–114. Fukuyama provides a condensed overview of his framework of how dignity politics employs a powerful emotional and political logic exploited by both egalitarian and exclusionary movements.
- Greenwald, Isaac (2024-06-27). "The Politics of Humiliation". The Baffler. This review interprets Stolen Pride as a study of how humiliation and perceived loss of dignity structure right-wing political identity and authoritarian susceptibility.
- Harrison, Samuel (2024). "Towards a political concept of dignity". Political esearch Exchange. 6 (1). doi:10.1080/2474736X.2024.2361163.
- United States Holocaust Memorial Museum. "Treaty of Versailles and the Rise of Nazism". Holocaust Encyclopedia. U.S. Holocaust Memorial Museum. This article explicitly links the Nazi exploitation of post-Versailles humiliation to their early political appeal.
- Hochschild, Arlie Russell (2024-03-02). "How the Politics of Shame Are Remaking America". The New York Times. Distillation of her findings on humiliation and pride in driving right-wing mobilization.
- Keane, John (2017). "Democracy and the Politics of Humiliation". The Conversation. Keane argues that modern populism arises when humiliated groups rally to leaders who promise restored dignity.
- McCrudden, Christopher (2008). "Human Dignity and Judicial Interpretation of Human Rights". European Journal of International Law. 19 (4): 655–724. doi:10.1093/ejil/chn043. ISBN 9780199535262.
- Pepine, Mara (June 2022). "The Age of Imitation: an Explanation of Today's Political Phenomena" (PDF). Liberal Read (15). European Liberal Forum. This European Liberal Forum review summarizes and endorses the book’s argument that imposed imitation and perceived moral asymmetry generate anti-liberal, dignity-centered resentment in Central and Eastern Europe and beyond.
- Rodriguez, Philippe-André (2015). "Human dignity as an essentially contested concept". Cambridge Review of International Affairs. 28 (2): 3. doi:10.1080/09557571.2015.1021297. S2CID 144462238.
- Ryan, Alan (July 11, 1996). "The Politics of Dignity". The New York Review of Books. 43 (12).
- Scheidel, Walter (1997). "The Roman Slave Supply". Journal of Roman Studies. 87: 156–169. doi:10.2307/300805.
- Shah, Timothy Samuel; Taylor, C. Holland (2021). "The 'Ashoka Approach' and Indonesian Leadership in the Movement for Pluralist Re-Awakening in South and Southeast Asia". The Review of Faith & International Affairs. 19 (2): 56–71. doi:10.1080/15570274.2021.1917149.
- Warner, Matt (2020). "The Light that Failed: A Reckoning". Cato Journal. 40 (3). Cato Institute: 819–823. This Cato Institute review foregrounds humiliation, resentment, and the “Age of Imitation” as the core mechanisms Krastev and Holmes use to explain illiberal, dignity-suffused backlash politics.
- Zhu, Zongmin (2021). "Reflections on the War Guilt Clause and Postwar German Humiliation". International Journal of Humanities and Social Science. 11 (6): 1–8. This paper notes that Hitler and the Nazi Party directly weaponized national humiliation to build mass support.
