= Al Akhawayn University =

American-style liberal arts university in Morocco

- جامعة الأخوين
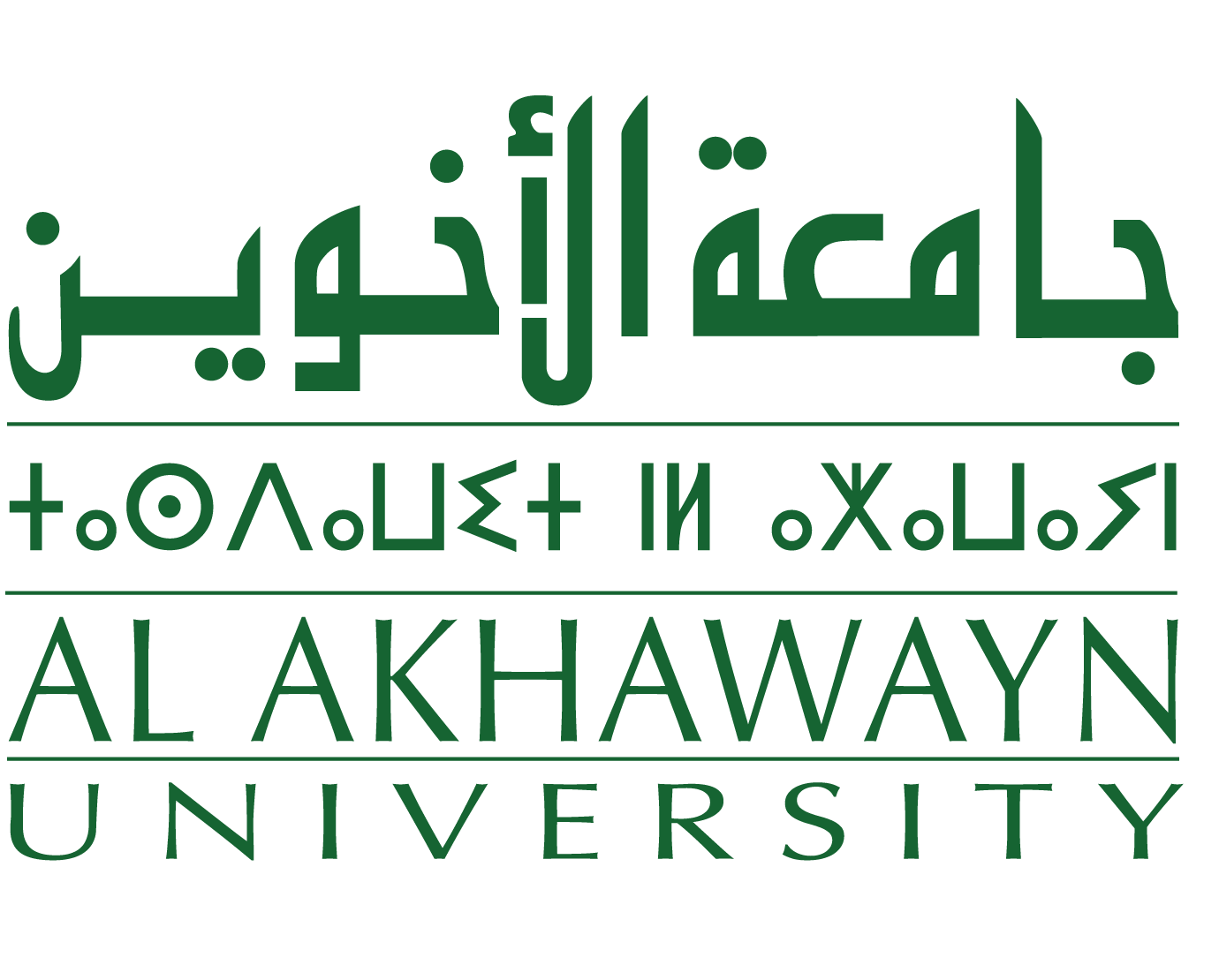
- Type: Public university
- Established: January 16, 1995; 31 years ago
- Accreditation: New England Commission of Higher Education (NECHE)
- Affiliations: Global Liberal Arts Alliance, APSIA, EPUF
- Chancellor: Abdellatif Jouahri
- President: Amine Bensaid
- Students: 3,500 (2024–2025)
- Location: Ifrane, Morocco; 33.539248°N 5.105553°W
- Campus: 72 hectares; Suburban, residential
- Colors: Green and white
- Website: aui.ma

Al Akhawayn University (Arabic: جامعة الأخوين; Berber: Tasdawit En Wawmaten; abbreviated AUI. Also known as The American University in Morocco) is a public, independent, not-for-profit, American-style liberal arts university located in Ifrane, Morocco. It follows an English-language liberal arts curriculum based on the American higher education system. Founded by royal decree (Dahir) in 1993 and officially inaugurated on January 16, 1995, by King Hassan II, it is the only university in North Africa to offer a fully American-style liberal arts curriculum, with English as the primary language of instruction.

Situated on a 72-hectare residential campus in the Middle Atlas Mountains at an elevation of approximately 1,650 meters, the university is about 70 km from the imperial city of Fez. Al Akhawayn University is accredited by the New England Commission of Higher Education (NECHE).

== History ==
Al Akhawayn University was created by King Hassan II, who sought to establish a high-quality institution in Morocco modeled on the American higher education system. The university was founded by Royal Decree (Dahir) in 1993 and inaugurated by the King on January 16, 1995. The Arabic name al-akhawayn, meaning "the two brothers," symbolizes the fraternal ties between the Kingdom of Morocco and the Kingdom of Saudi Arabia, whose respective sovereigns supported the project.

The U.S. Department of State provided funding to the school in 2020 and 2021 through the Middle East Partnership Initiative. In 2021, the department paused funding due to reports of sexual harassment against students and faculty members. The university said they were taking measures to address the issues. The university fired a professor in 2026 due to allegations of sexual harassment.

== Academics ==
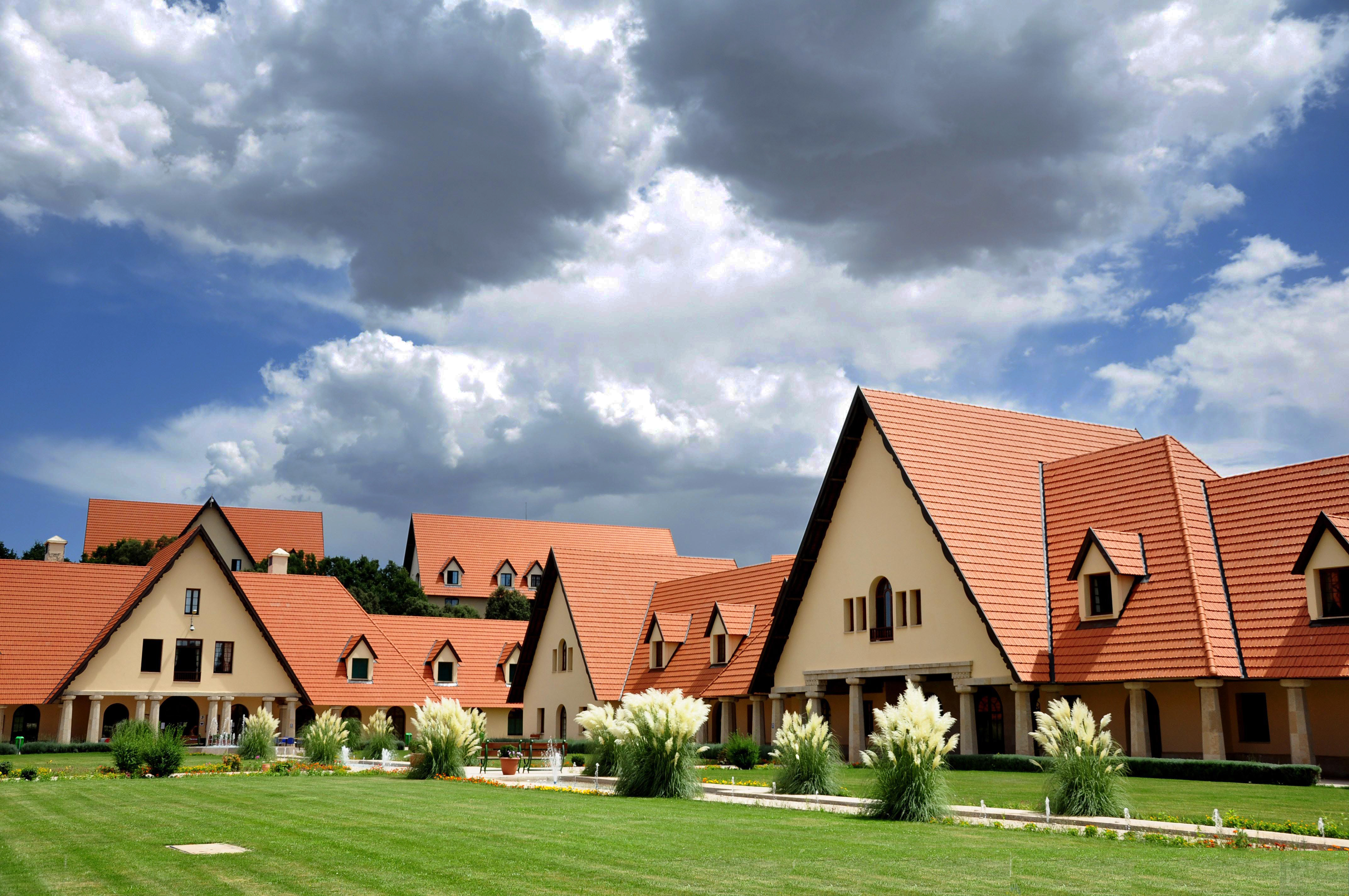
The Al Akhawayn campus (2010)

=== Schools and programs ===
Al Akhawayn University offers undergraduate and graduate programs through three schools: School of Business Administration (SBA), School of Science and Engineering (SSE), and School of Humanities and Social Sciences (SHSS). All programs are structured around a common core curriculum inspired by the American liberal arts tradition.

English is the primary language of instruction across all programs. Students also develop proficiency in French, Arabic, and often a third foreign language.

=== Accreditation and recognition ===
Al Akhawayn University holds accreditation from the New England Commission of Higher Education (NECHE), a US regional accreditor. The university is also recognized by the Moroccan Ministry of Higher Education, Scientific Research and Innovation.

Al Akhawayn University was ranked 1st in Morocco and 44th in the Arab World by Times Higher Education (2018). It was featured in Times Higher Education's coverage of the global future of liberal arts education (2025).

== Notable alumni ==
Among the institution's alumni are:

- Maha Laziri
- Soufiane El Khalidy
- Mohamed Tessoumi
- Hatim Aznague
- Youssef Ksiyer
- Amina Faouzi Zizi
- Amine Kouame
- Ayoub Makroz
- Fatima Zahra Nouass
- Mohammed Benouarrek
- Réda Dalil
- Soukaina Ouaddar — Moroccan champion equestrian and Olympian
- Aomar Boum — anthropologist, appointed to endowed chair at the University of California
- Samir Lebbar — CEO of Procter and Gamble North Africa
- Zaynab El Bernoussi — political scientist

== See also ==
- List of Islamic educational institutions
- List of universities in Morocco
- Science and technology in Morocco
- Education in Morocco
