= EPUF =

EPUF may refer to:

- Ethiopian Unity Patriots Front
- EuroMed Permanent University Forum
- United Protestant Church of France
