= World Youth Forum =

International NGO based in Egypt

- منتدي شباب العالم
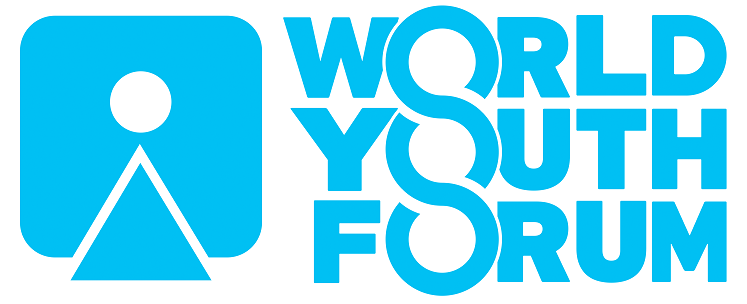
- Abbreviation: WYF
- Formation: November 2017; 8 years ago
- Type: International NGO
- Headquarters: Sharm El-Sheikh, Egypt
- Region served: Worldwide
- Website: wyfegypt.com

World Youth Forum (Arabic: منتدي شباب العالم) is an international NGO founded in 2017, based in Sharm El-Sheikh, Egypt. WYF's mission is to send a message of peace, prosperity, harmony, and progress from the youth to the entire world. The forum was initially sponsored early on and held under the auspices of the president of Egypt, Abdel Fattah el-Sisi, who agreed in November 2017 during a peace marathon, President Abdel Fattah el-Sisi agreed to hold the forum annually.

On February 18, 2021, the United Nations adopted World Youth Forum as an international platform.

The forum became an annual event, being hosted in November, after following one of its recommendations in as the first edition of the forum. Since its launch in 2017, World Youth Forum had 4 editions starting with over 3200 attendees from 113 countries and reaching a total of 5,000 delegates in 2018 from 169 countries. The most recent forum was held in January 2022.The planned 2023 edition was canceled due to global economic challenges, with funds redirected to youth development initiatives. No further annual editions have been held as of 2025.

ًWYF registrations are open to all youth of all nations between the ages 18–40 years old. Youth that are influential in their communities and areas of study are also encouraged to apply as speakers as well. People can attend WYF as an attendee, a speaker, a model participant, a workshop participant or a world youth theater participant.

== Discussion tracks ==
The World Youth Forum agenda opens discussion into three tracks which reflect the visions and aspirations of the world’s youth, tackling themes and topics of interest to international youth, creating a platform to express views, present ideas and share experiences throughout its sessions.

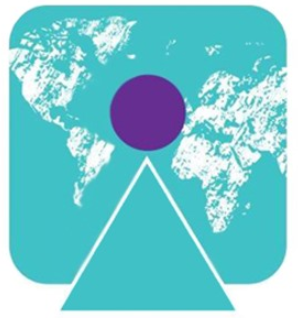
World Youth Forum logo from 2017

=== Peace ===
- The role of world leaders in building and sustaining peace Euro-Mediterranean cooperation: a strategic partnership humanitarian aid: responsibilities in confronting challenges Resurrecting communities post-conflict: from the Marshall Plan to Syria
- The role of soft power in countering intellectual extremism and terrorism
- Day Zero: Water security in the wake of climate change

=== Development ===
- Volunteerism as a means towards a more integrated society Agenda 2063: The Africa we want
- How do we build future leaders?
- Narrowing the gender gap in the employment market.
- The rapid changes in the Energy Map: “What’s Powering the world?
- Enabling the disabled persons: towards an integrated community

=== Creativity ===
- Employment opportunities in the AI age
- Digital citizenship: digital rights and responsibilities in the internet world
- The role of cinema and art in shaping communities
- Does social media infringe on privacy?
- E-sports: how technology is utilized in sports?
- Entrepreneurs and Innovative startups role in economic growth

== Editions ==
=== WYF 2017 ===
In July 2017, the president announced organizing the WYF in Sharm el-Sheikh during the fourth National Youth Conference in Alexandria. Under the auspices of Egypt's president, the tourist attraction city of Sharm el-Sheikh was chosen to host the first edition of World Youth Forum from 4–10 November.

The forum brought together more than 3,000 youths represented by 60 delegations from 113 countries across the world, a total of 222 speakers from 64 countries and expertise in various fields, all gathered in 46 sessions. to explore key issues facing their generation, and determine their role in implementing the global development goals and in facing terrorism. In addition, the forum witnessed a simulation of the UN Security Council through WYF-MUN.

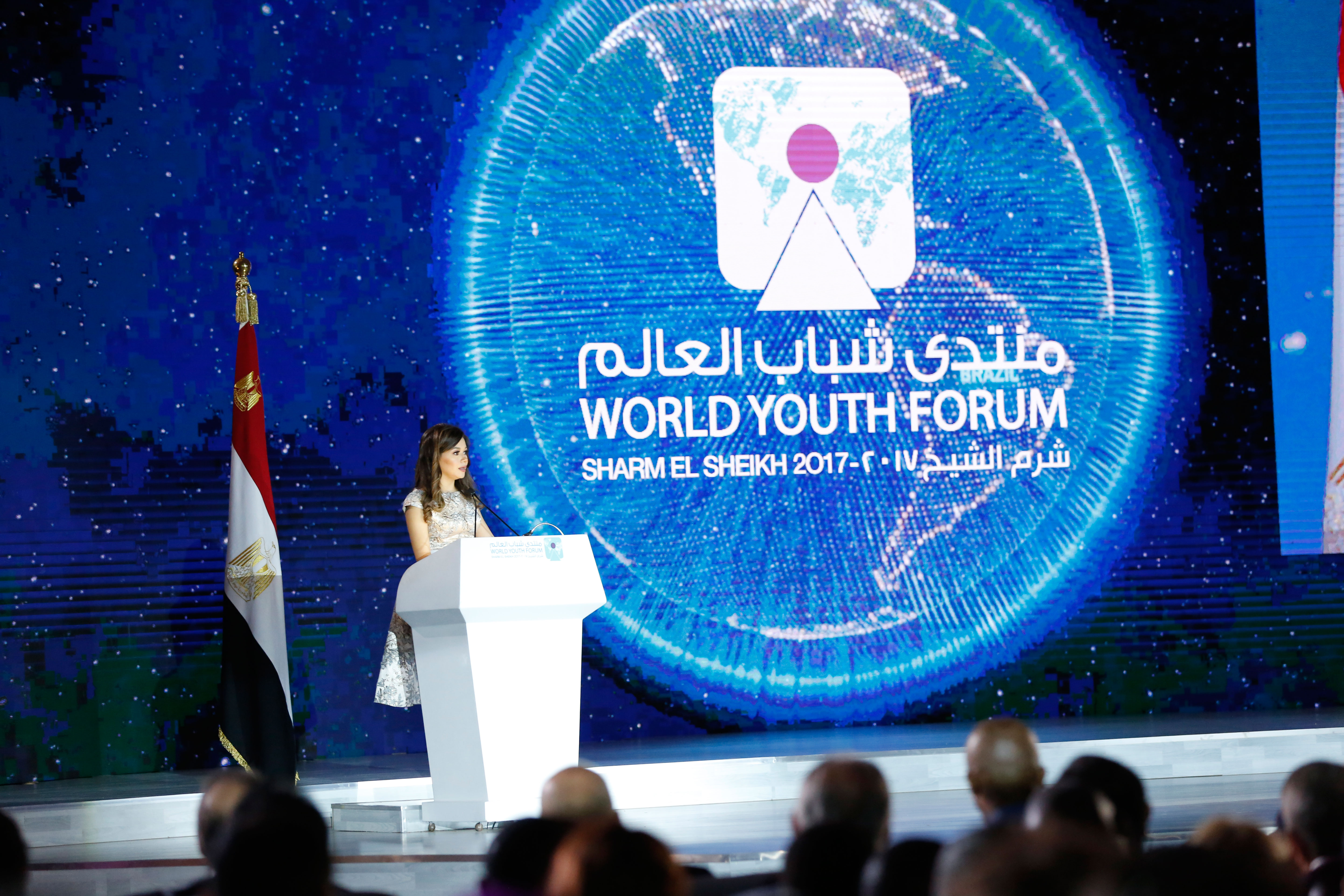
WYF 2017 in Sharm El-Sheikh

Among WYF 2017 keynote speakers was Lamya Haji Bashar, Yazidi survivor, who was held captive by ISIS.

=== WYF 2018 ===
The second edition of WYF was hosted from 3–6 November. More than 230,000 people from around the world applied to attend the four-day conference of the 2018 edition in Egypt’s Sharm El-Sheikh and discuss topics relating to peace, development and creativity.

The second edition of the Forum was attended by some 5,000 young people from 145 countries.

In the closing session of WYF 2018, President Abdel Fatah el-Sisi announced ten recommendations to be executed before holding the third edition of the forum, among the recommendations was announcing Egypt’s Aswan city as the capital of African Youth in 2019.

=== WYF 2019 ===
The 2019 edition was the third edition of WYF, it was held in South Sinai’s Sharm el-Sheikh from 14–17 December, under the auspices of the Egyptian Presidency.

Egypt's Pope, Tawadros II of the Church of Alexandria said the forum held annually in Egypt reflects the president’s care about youth. He also hailed the forum’s management of theatrical shows that were presented on December 13, to bring together promising artists from all over the world to present their talents and represent their cultures.
