= Mediterranean Region (disambiguation) =

The Mediterranean Region generally refers to the Mediterranean Basin

Mediterranean Region may also refer to:

- Mediterranean Region, Turkey, a region of Turkey
- Mediterranean Region (statistical), a statistical region of Turkey
- Euro-Mediterranean region
