= Zaynab El Bernoussi =

Moroccan political scientist

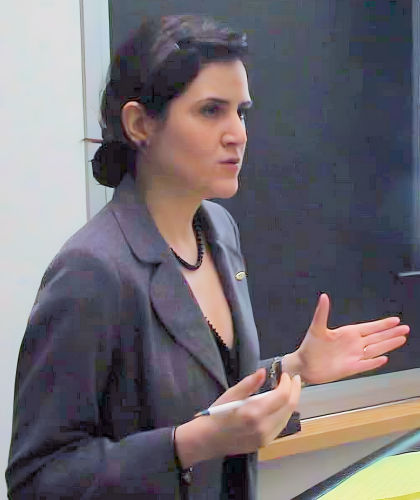
- El Bernoussi in 2017
- Born: 1986 (age 39–40)
- Occupation: Political scientist
- Awards: IPSA 2025 Global South award 2015 Arab Prize (ACRPS)

Academic work
- Institutions: The Africa Institute, Global Studies University Sharjah

Zaynab El Bernoussi (Arabic: زينب البرنوصي), also known as Z, is a Moroccan professor of political science and author known for her research on the Arab Spring and understanding the political use of the concept of dignity in various grievances. She has been described as part of "the new generation" of Arab international relations scholars. El Bernoussi was appointed interim chair of the Humanities Department at The Africa Institute, Global Studies University Sharjah in 2025.

== Education ==
El Bernoussi was born and raised in Morocco. She obtained a French baccalaureate from Lycée Descartes. She also lived in Spain, the US, and Hong Kong, China.

She holds a Bachelor of Business Administration from Al Akhawayn University. At the time, she founded a student group called GREEN (Group of Rational Ecologists and Environmentalists). She did a semester abroad at Georgetown University, where she participated in the Yale 3rd Annual Student Climate Conference as part of her work for the Chesapeake Climate Action Network (CCAN). She also did an exchange at Bocconi University. Then, Z got a Master in Finance from IE Business School, an MPA from Columbia University, and a PhD in political and social sciences from Catholic University of Louvain, Belgium. In 2010, she contributed to the Human Development Report for its tenth anniversary, published by the United Nations Development Programme (UNDP).

== Career ==
El Bernoussi received several scholarships and grants. In 2014, she was a Carnegie doctoral follow at the University of North Carolina at Chapel Hill under the mentorship of Charles Kurzman. In 2017, she was a visiting scholar at Smith College. She was also a Fulbright visiting scholar at the Weatherhead Center for International Affairs at Harvard University in 2017.

El Bernoussi also taught at Al Akhawayn University, International University of Rabat, and New York University Abu Dhabi.

She serves as the Chair of the Theory Section at the International Studies Association and is on the editorial board of the Journal PS: Political Science & Politics.

== Scholarship ==
El Bernoussi's scholarship explores international politics, postcolonial theory, and the concept of dignity.

Her first book Dignity in the Egyptian Revolution: Protest and Demand during the Arab Uprisings received several reviews. The book examines the function and meanings of dignity, or in Arabic, 'karama', in the 2011 uprising in Egypt. The book grew from her 2015 article where she coined the term 'dignition', a portmanteau of the concepts of dignity and recognition, to refer to a particular potency of dignity demands as they unite various grievers and prioritize their queries. Sarthak Mohapatra and Rajendra Singh gloss El Bernoussi's term dignition as "the need for dignity embedded in the politics of recognition in a post-colonial context". The need to be recognised is central to this dignity. El Bernoussi is a featured speaker on revolutions and recognition in the Global South for the 2026 Bengal Delta Conference by the Dacca Institute of Research and Analytics, particularly given Bangladesh's reputation as the first successful "Gen Z revolution".

El Bernoussi's second book, co-authored with Adriana María Garriga-López, Giuliano Martiniello, and Bashir Saade, was published in 2025 and looks at the international political economy and the global South and was published by Routledge.

She contributed to the Human Dignity and Humiliation Studies network, founded by Nobel Peace Prize nominee Evelin Lindner as part of her own work coordinating the Human and Economic Development Research Unit (HEDRU). She was also much influenced by the seminal work of Conflict Resolution expert, Dr. Donna Hicks, who closely worked with Archbishop Desmond Tutu in facilitating dialogue between victims and perpetrators of the Northern Irish conflict. El Bernoussi was hosted by both Hicks and her mentor, Herbert Kelman, at Harvard University. Her early work focused on the instrumentalization of dignity politics in the so-called Arab Spring, but also beyond in instances of broad legal reform, including Islamic bioethics.

She has also been contributing to critical security studies, notably the Beirut School, sponsored by the Arab Council for Social Sciences, based in Beirut, Lebanon. Her more recent work explores ways to measure dignity in the form of a global index and was promoted by the notable globalization expert, Jan Nederveen Pieterse, at University of California, Santa Barbara. She has also been looking at Sino-Arab relations and the halal economy.

In addition to English, El Bernoussi publishes in Arabic and French.

== Awards ==
- The third Arab Prize, Arab Center for Research and Policy Studies for study on Egypt in 2015, particularly honouring her paper "The postcolonial politics of dignity: From the 1965 Suez nationalization to the 2011 revolution in Egypt".
- 2025 Global South Award, awarded by the International Political Science Association. The award was renamed in tribute to late Nigerian diplomat, Margaret Vogt.
- 10 African scholars to watch from Africa in 2025 by The Africa Report.

== Books ==
- Dignity in the Egyptian Revolution: Protest and Demand during the Arab Uprisings. Cambridge University Press. 2021. ISBN 978-1-108-84585-4.
- El Bernoussi, Zaynab; Garriga-López, Adriana María; Martiniello, Giuliano; Saade, Bashir (2025). International Political Economy and the Global South: Perspectives from Africa, Asia, Latin America, and the Middle East. Taylor & Francis. ISBN 978-1-040-36547-2.
