= Youssef Ksiyer =

Moroccan content creator

- يوسف قصير
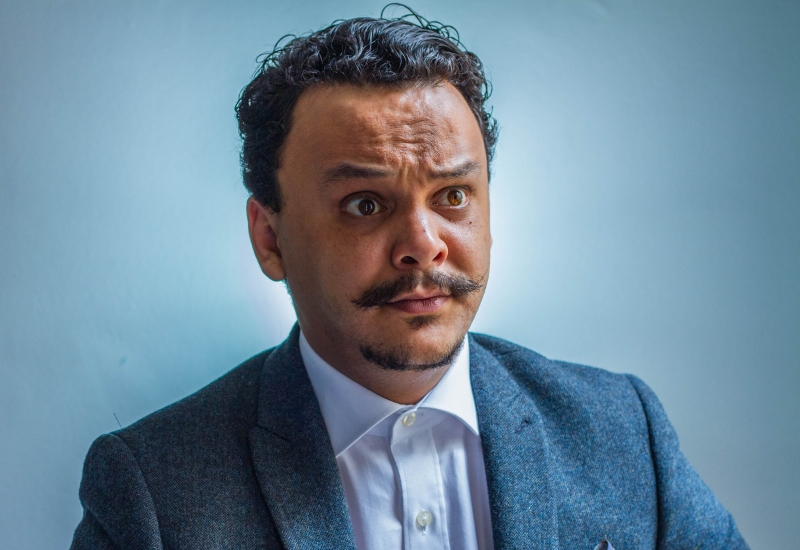
- Born: 27 December 1983 (age 42); Casablanca, Morocco
- Education: Al Akhawayn University
- Occupations: Comedian, Activist Television, Radio, Podcast Host

Youssef Ksiyer (Arabic: يوسف قصير; born December 27, 1983) is a comedian, content creator, and multimedia host from Casablanca, Morocco. He is passionate about writing, interpretation, and comedy, creating content in Arabic, French, and English. When performing, he highlights current news as well as environmental problems.

== Career ==
In 2003, Ksiyer studied at Al Akhawayn University, and majored in Business Administration. He was the president of the drama club at the university. Shortly after graduating, he worked in Casablanca as a marketing manager at Yamaha. He spent three years working in Communication and Marketing. He then decided to shift to an artistic career and in 2007, he won the first prize of the best comedian, 2nd edition, in Casablanca. In 2011, his comedy style was noticed by Jamel Comedy Club in Marrakesh. In 2012, he then integrated the troupe in Paris. Later that year, he was invited by Hassan El Fad to perform in the opening of Marrakech du Rire. In an interview with Ya Biladi in 2017, he mentioned Dave Chappelle, Richard Pryor, and Chris Rock as sources of inspiration.

He is currently the manager of JOOJ Media which is a Moroccan social media platform mostly active on Instagram.

== Marrakech du Rire ==
Marrakech du rire is an international festival of humour that takes places in El Badi Palace every year. Ksiyer performed in many editions of Marrakech du Rire.

Marrakech du Rire	Year	Details
1st Edition	2011	First appearance – Won the 1st Prize
2nd Edition	2012	Invited by Hassan El Fad to perform
3rd Edition	2013	Biodegradable
4th Edition	2014	Biodegradable
5th Edition	2015	Won the prize of the "scène ouvertes"

== Live Shows ==
- Biodegradable, June 12, 2014.Marrakech du Rire, Dar Attakafa.
- Biodegradable, December 14, 2012. Studio des Arts Vivants, Casablanca.
- Stand Up, January 2019. Afrique du rire in Casablanca and Dakar, Senegal.
- Stand Up, May 26, 2019. Backstage Casablanca.
- Stand Up, May 10, 2019. L'uzine.
- Stand Up, April 2, 2019. Backstage Casablanca.

== Host ==
=== Radio ===
- La matinale de Youssef Ksiyer with Radio 2M, 2019.

=== Podcast ===
- SOULIMA Podcast. The main topics are film, television, and other forms of art. Ksiyer invites different guests to debate around those themes. The podcasts are available on YouTube, Deezer, Apple Podcast, Google Podcast, and Spotify.

=== Online Shows ===
- Best of Experience Al Akhawayn University with Youssef Ksiyer, 2020.

=== Television ===
- The host of the television show "Multiplayer" on 2M (TV channel) in collaboration with Inwi, 2020.

== Activism ==
Ksiyer participated in a campaign organized by UN Women to fight against violence towards women and the stereotypes built around it. In 2012, he was part of "Rire Solidaire 3", a fundraising event organized by Hassan El Fad to help homeless children in Marrakech.

In 2020, he gave a TEDTalk in collaboration with TEDxENSAKhouribga where he expressed his concern about climate change and ecology. He focused his speech around the Moroccan and African Environment in relation to this global issue.
