= Alan McPherson =

American historian

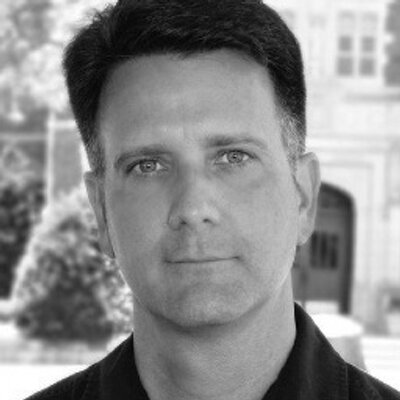
Alan McPherson

Alan L. McPherson is an American historian specializing in US-Latin American relations. He is the Thomas J. Freaney, Jr., Professor of History at Temple University, where he is also the Director of the Center for the Study of Force and Diplomacy (CENFAD).

== Biography ==
McPherson was born in Berkeley, California, but grew up in Québec, Canada, where he received his Bachelor's from the Université de Montréal in 1994, and was later a fellow of the Canadian Social Sciences and Humanities Research Council. He earned his Master's degree from San Francisco State University in 1996 and his Doctorate from the University of North Carolina at Chapel Hill in 2001, with a thesis "A critical ambivalence: anti-Americanism in U.S.-Caribbean relations, 1958-1966" He taught at Howard University from 2001 to 2008 and the University of Oklahoma from 2008 to 2017. He has been a fellow of the US Social Science Research Council, twice a Fulbright fellow (to the Dominican Republic in 2006 and Argentina in 2012), and a fellow of Harvard University's David Rockefeller Center for Latin American Studies.

In addition to his books about US-Latin American relations and anti-Americanism, he has published dozens of chapters, journal articles, and op-eds.

== Books ==
- McPherson, Alan L. Yankee No! Anti-Americanism in U.S.--Latin American Relations. Cambridge, Mass: Harvard University Press, 2003. According to WorldCat, the book is held in 1160 libraries
- McPherson, Alan L. Intimate Ties, Bitter Struggles The United States and Latin America Since 1945. Washington, D.C.: Potomac Books, 2006. According to WorldCat, the book is held in 864 libraries
- McPherson, Alan L. Anti-Americanism in Latin America and the Caribbean. New York: Berghahn Books, 2006.
- Ivan Krastev and Alan L. McPherson, eds. The Anti-American Century. Budapest: Central European University Press, 2007.
- McPherson, Alan L., editor Encyclopedia of U.S. Military Interventions in Latin America. Santa Barbara, Calif: ABC-CLIO, 2013. 2 vols.
- McPherson, Alan L. The Invaded: How Latin Americans and Their Allies Fought and Ended U.S. Occupations. Oxford; New York : Oxford University Press, 2014.
- McPherson, Alan L. The World and U2: One Band’s Remaking of Global Activism. Lanham, Md.: Rowman & Littlefield, 2015.
- McPherson, Alan L. and Yannick Wehrli, eds. Beyond Geopolitics: New Histories of Latin America at the League of Nations. Albuquerque: University of New Mexico Press, 2015.
- McPherson, Alan L. A Short History of US Military Interventions in Latin America and the Caribbean. New York: Wiley-Blackwell, 2016.
- McPherson, Alan L., editor. The SHAFR Guide: An Annotated Bibliography of United States Foreign Relations Since 1600. Leiden: Brill, 2017.
- McPherson, Alan L. Ghosts of Sheridan Circle: How a Washington Assassination Brought Pinochet's Terror State to Justice. Chapel Hill: University of North Carolina Press, 2019.
- McPherson, Alan L. The Breach: Iran-Contra and the Assault on American Democracy. Chapel Hill: University of North Carolina Press, 2025.
