= Soukaina Ouaddar =

Moroccan Show jumper

Personal information
- Born: 10 August 1996 (age 29) Rabat
- Education: Al Akhawayn University
- Parent: Abdelkebir Ouaddar (father)

Sport
- Country: Morocco
- Sport: Equestrian
- Event: Show jumping

Soukaina Ouaddar (born 10 August 1996) is a Moroccan show jumper. She competed at several Moroccan National Championships and rode at top level in Morocco (1m45). She works at the Royal Moroccan Federation of Equestrian Sports in the Communication Department.

== Early life and education ==
Soukaina began riding at the age of 8 or 9, despite not having an initial attraction to horses. Her interest was nurtured by her mother, who owned a breeding farm, and she aspired to follow her father’s career path. She trained under Farid Amanzar, a former student of her father.

Between 2017 and 2019, she pursued her studies in communication at the American University Al Akhawayn in Ifrane while continuing her equestrian career.

== Equestrian career ==
Soukaina competed in her first Grand Prix at a height of 1.45 meters at the age of 18, maintaining an average of two competitions per month. In October 2015, she secured her first international show jumping victory at the CSI1* Rabat, a stage of the Morocco Royal Tour, during the 32nd edition of Rabat Horse Week, finishing ahead of Amine Bennis and Majid Djaïdi.

In March 2018, she participated in the Talents Hermès category at the prestigious Saut Hermès competition, marking her debut in the event and the first representation of Morocco in this category. Later, in June 2018, she won the Feu Sa Majesté Hassan II prize at the official show jumping competition of the Royal Guard at Méchouar in Touargua.

== Notable achievements ==
Soukaina has consistently performed at a high level in national and international competitions. Some of her notable results include:

- October 2014: 5th place at the CSI1* Tétouan (1.20m) with Silvio Z; 3rd place in the 1.15m event with Part of Me 2.
- October 2015: Winner of the CSI1* Rabat (1.25m), part of the Morocco Royal Tour.
- October 2016: Winner of the Prix de la Fédération Royale Marocaine de Polo at the CSI1* Tétouan (1.30m); 5th place at the CSI1* El Jadida (1.25m) with Silvio Z.
- March 2018: 4th place at the CSI2* Cannes (1.40m) with Reading de Sienne.
- June 2018: Winner of the Prix Feu S.M Hassan II at Touargua with Reading de Sienne.
- October 2018: 3rd place at the CSI1* Rabat (1.25m–1.30m) with Reading de Sienne.
- October 2022: 4th place at Morocco Royal Tour.

== Personal attributes and horses ==
Soukaina is one of the few professional female riders in Morocco, navigating a predominantly male-dominated field. Her primary horse is Reading de Sienne, a Selle Français by Flipper d'Elle. She also rides Silvio Z, gifted to her by her trainer in 2010, a son of Chellano Z, born in 2005. Additionally, she has ridden Rhénan Part of Me 2, born in 1999.
