= Réda Dalil =

Moroccan journalist and writer (1978–2024)

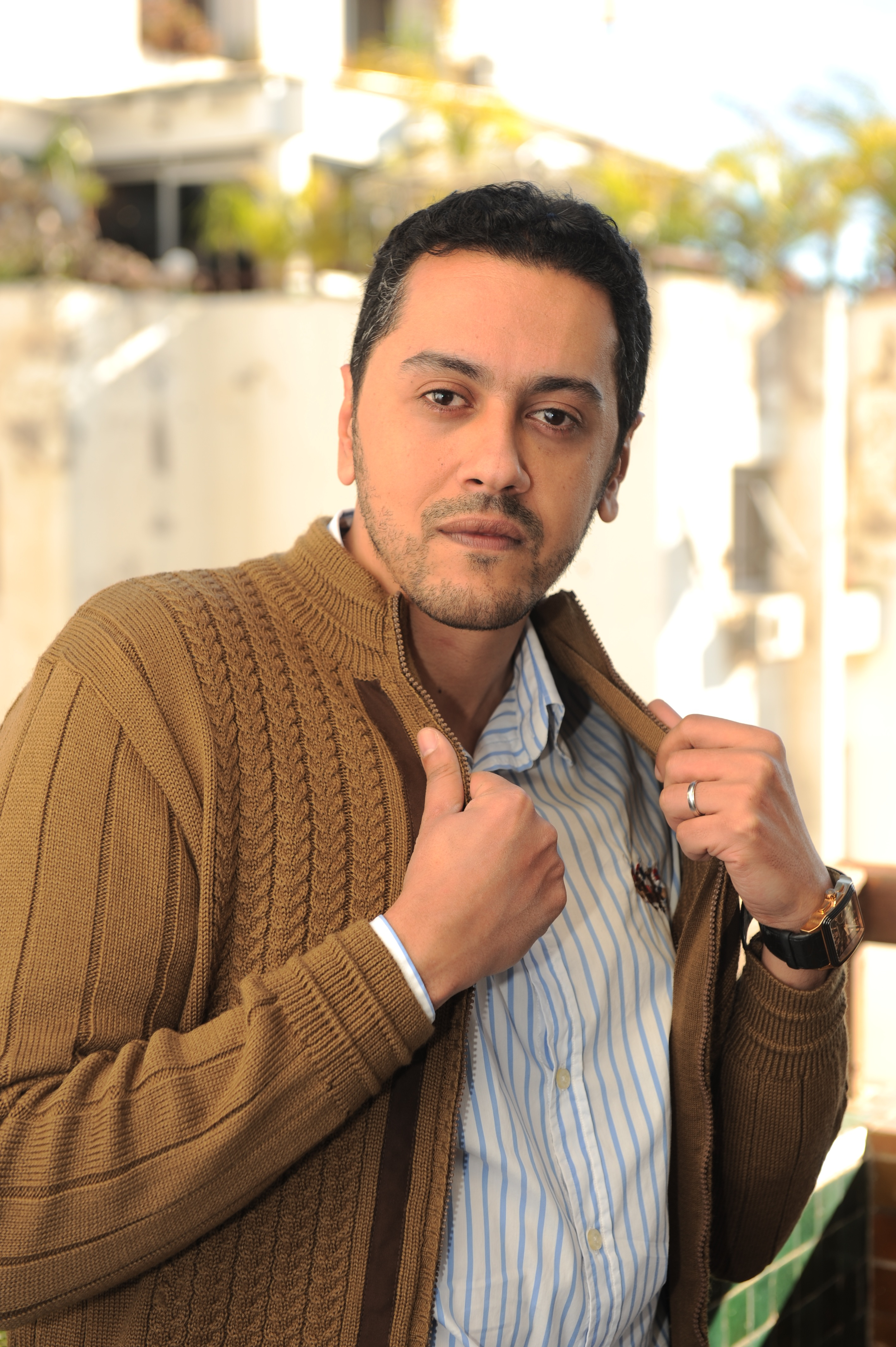
- Dalil in 2014
- Born: 3 May 1978; Casablanca, Morocco
- Died: 19 March 2024 (aged 45); Rabat, Morocco
- Education: Al Akhawayn University (BBA)
- Occupations: Journalist; writer

Réda Dalil (Moroccan Arabic: رضا دليل; 3 May 1978 – 19 March 2024) was a Moroccan journalist and writer.

== Biography ==
Born in Casablanca on 3 May 1978, Dalil earned a Bachelor of Business Administration from Al Akhawayn University and became publication manager of the weekly magazine Le Temps. In 2014, he published his first novel, Le Job. That year, he was awarded the Prix littéraire de La Mamounia, which rewarded the best French-language novel of the year. That December, he was awarded the Prix Gros Sel. He received significant press coverage for the success of his novel.

In 2015, Dalil contributed to Auteurs à 100 %, which consisted of a collection of short stories, published by Éditeurs de talents. All profits from the book were donated to the Association Enfance Maghreb Avenir.

Réda Dalil died in Rabat on 19 March 2024, at the age of 45. He had been battling a long illness since 2020, having recovered before relapsing and undergoing surgery.
