= Ivan Krastev =

Bulgarian political scientist

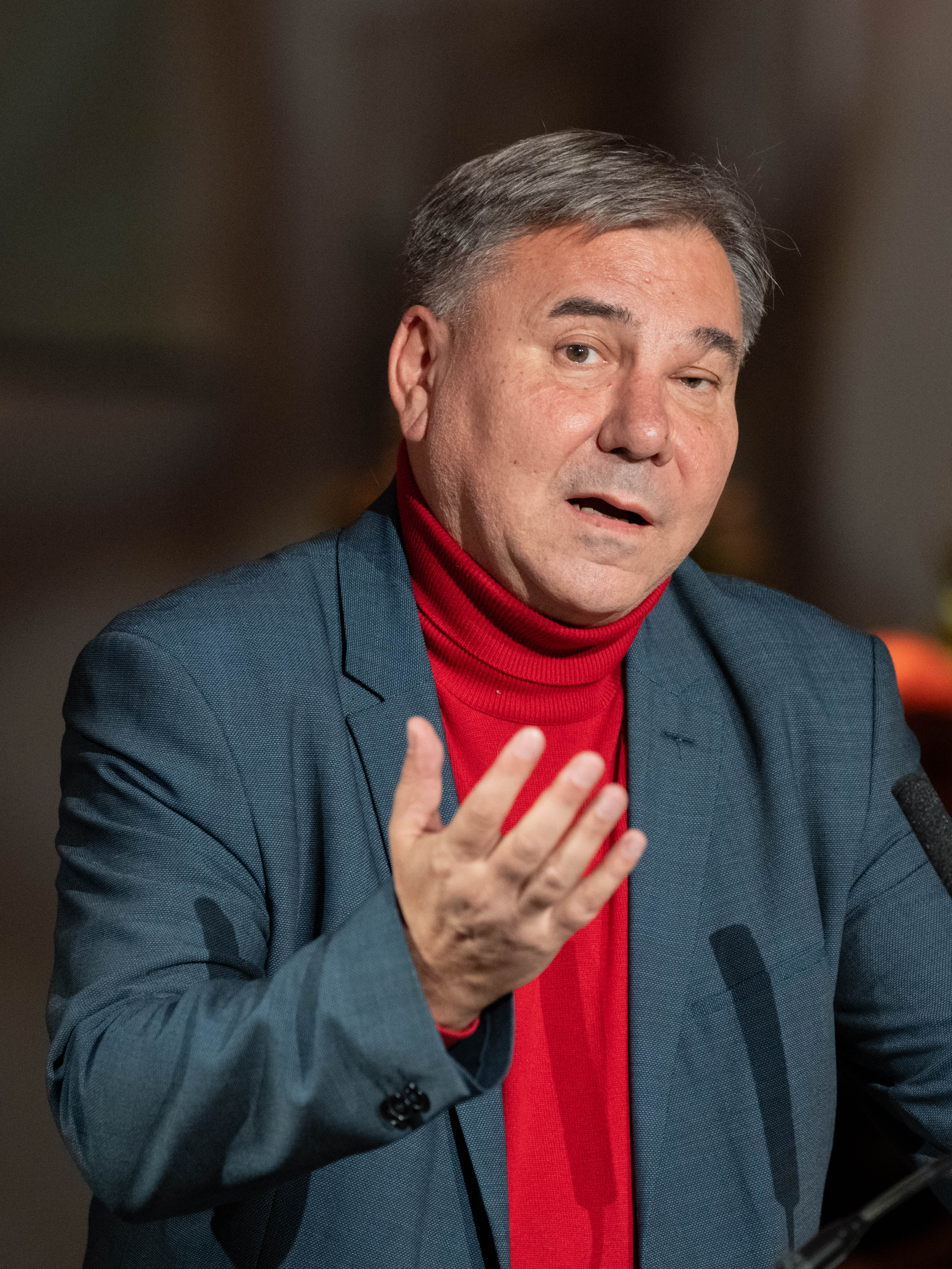
Krastev in 2025

Ivan Krastev (Bulgarian: Иван Кръстев, born 1965 in Lukovit, Bulgaria), is a political scientist, the chairman of the Centre for Liberal Strategies in Sofia, permanent fellow at the IWM (Institute of Human Sciences) in Vienna, and 2013-4-17 Richard von Weizsäcker fellow at the Robert Bosch Stiftung in Berlin.

He is a founding board member of the European Council on Foreign Relations, a member of the board of trustees of the International Crisis Group and is a contributing opinion writer for The New York Times.

From 2004 to 2006 Krastev was executive director of the International Commission on the Balkans chaired by the former Italian Prime Minister Giuliano Amato. He was Editor-in-Chief of the Bulgarian Edition of Foreign Policy and was a member of the Council of the International Institute for Strategic Studies in London from 2005 to 2011). Since 2016, he serves as a director and trustee of the School of Civic Education in London, which forms part of an association of schools of political studies, under the auspices of the Directorate General of Democracy (“DGII”) of the Council of Europe.

His books in English include Shifting Obsessions: Three Essays on the Politics of Anticorruption (CEU Press, 2004), The Anti-American Century, co-edited with Alan McPherson, (CEU Press, 2007), In Mistrust We Trust: Can Democracy Survive When We Don't Trust Our Leaders, (TED Books, 2013), Democracy Disrupted. The Politics of Global Protest (UPenn Press, May 2014) and After Europe (UPenn Press, 2017). He is a co-author with Stephen Holmes of the book The Light that Failed on East European politics.

== Bibliography ==
- Shifting Obsessions: Three Essays on the Politics of Anticorruption, CEU Press, 2004.
- The Anti-American Century, Alan McPherson and Ivan Krastev (eds.), CEU Press, 2007.
- Europe's Democracy Paradox, The American Interest, March/April 2012.
- In Mistrust We Trust: Can Democracy Survive When We Don't Trust Our Leaders?, TED books, 3 January 2013
- Democracy Disrupted. Penn University Press. 2014. Archived from the original on July 6, 2014.
- After Europe, Penn University Press, 2017
- The Light that Failed: A Reckoning, co-authored with Stephen Holmes, Penguin, 2019
- Is It Tomorrow Yet?: Paradoxes of the Pandemic, 2020, Allen Lane, ISBN 978-0241483459, (96 pages)

== Awards ==
- Czech Medal of Merit (2026)
