= Carlo Strenger =

Swiss-Israeli psychologist

- קרלו שטרנגר
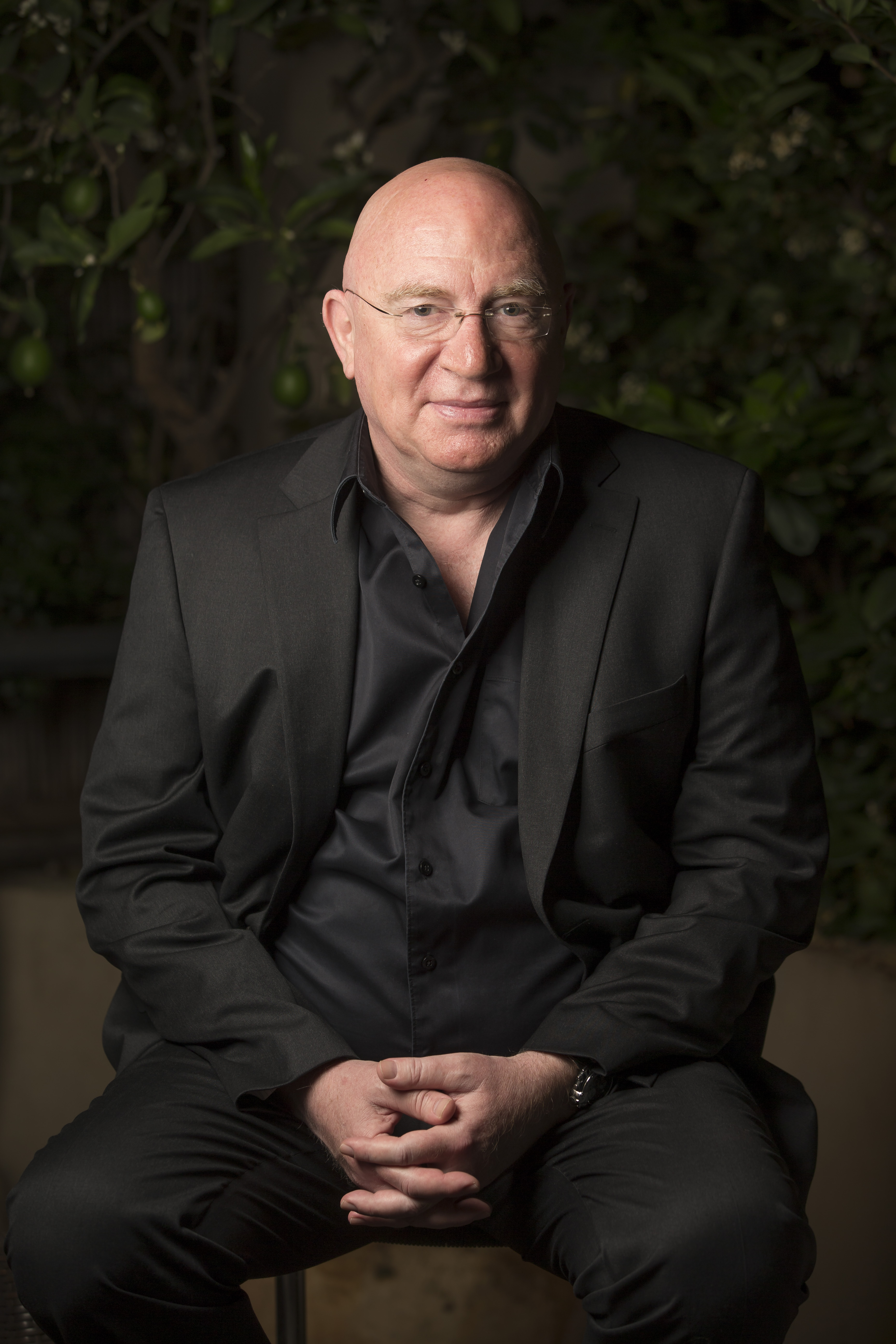
- Strenger in 2016
- Born: July 16, 1958; Basel, Switzerland
- Died: October 25, 2019 (aged 61)
- Occupation: Professor

Academic background
- Education: Hebrew University of Jerusalem (1989)

Academic work
- Discipline: Philosophy
- Sub-discipline: Clinical psychology
- Institutions: Tel Aviv University

Carlo Strenger (Hebrew: קרלו שטרנגר; July 16, 1958 – October 25, 2019) was a Swiss and Israeli psychologist, philosopher, existential psychoanalyst and public intellectual who served as professor of psychology and philosophy at Tel Aviv University (at its Cohn Institute for the History and Philosophy of Science and Ideas and School of Psychological Sciences).

He was a senior research fellow at the Center for the Study of Terrorism at John Jay College, on the scientific advisory board of the Sigmund Freud Foundation in Vienna, and a member of the Seminar for Existential Psychoanalysis in Zurich. His research focused on the impact of globalization on meaning, personal and group identity.

As a columnist for Haaretz and Neue Zürcher Zeitung, he wrote primarily on the Middle East conflict, as well as European politics and culture, on which he took a politically and philosophically liberal perspective.

== Early life and career ==
Carlo Strenger was born in Basel, Switzerland, to a Belgian mother and Swiss father. His family was Orthodox Jewish and he was raised as a religious Jew. As a teenager, he lost his faith and became an atheist. He describes his transition from Orthodox Judaism to secular atheism as the defining experience of his life. Already an atheist, he spent a year at a yeshiva after completing high school and then started his studies in psychology and philosophy in Zürich, Switzerland. At age 19, he moved to Israel and studied philosophy and clinical psychology at the Hebrew University of Jerusalem, where he received his Ph.D. in 1989, and taught modern thought at the Department of Philosophy. He then moved to Tel Aviv, where he lived with his wife, Julia Elad-Strenger, a political psychologist.

== Contributions to psychoanalysis ==
From 1986 to 2000, Strenger's focus of research was on psychoanalysis, a theme he has returned to in his later work as well. His first Book Between Hermeneutics and Science argued that psychoanalysis had insufficient evidential foundation because of its almost exclusive reliance on clinical data, and argued that psychoanalysis needed to interact with mainstream science to avoid becoming irrelevant. He has developed this position further in Freud's Legacy in the Global Era (2016), taking into account recent developments in cognitive neurosciences and contemporary existential psychology, and also argued that psychoanalysis needs to take into account the deep social and cultural changes, partially due to globalization, that shape today's patients' lives, a theme he has written extensively about in the last twenty years (see section below).

During the 1990s he was in private practice in Tel Aviv, while teaching as an adjunct professor at Tel Aviv University. He aimed at combining psychoanalytic and existentialist motifs in his clinical work and presented his existential psychoanalytic perspective in Individuality, the Impossible Project (1998).

Some critics saw the book as a major contribution to psychoanalysis, arguing that Strenger's perspective on the self as an emerging creation rather than pre-existing entity was philosophically and clinically revolutionary. Others took issue with Strenger's very liberal approach towards sexual perversion and argued that his respect for the patient's subjectivity made him underestimate some of his patients’ pathologies.

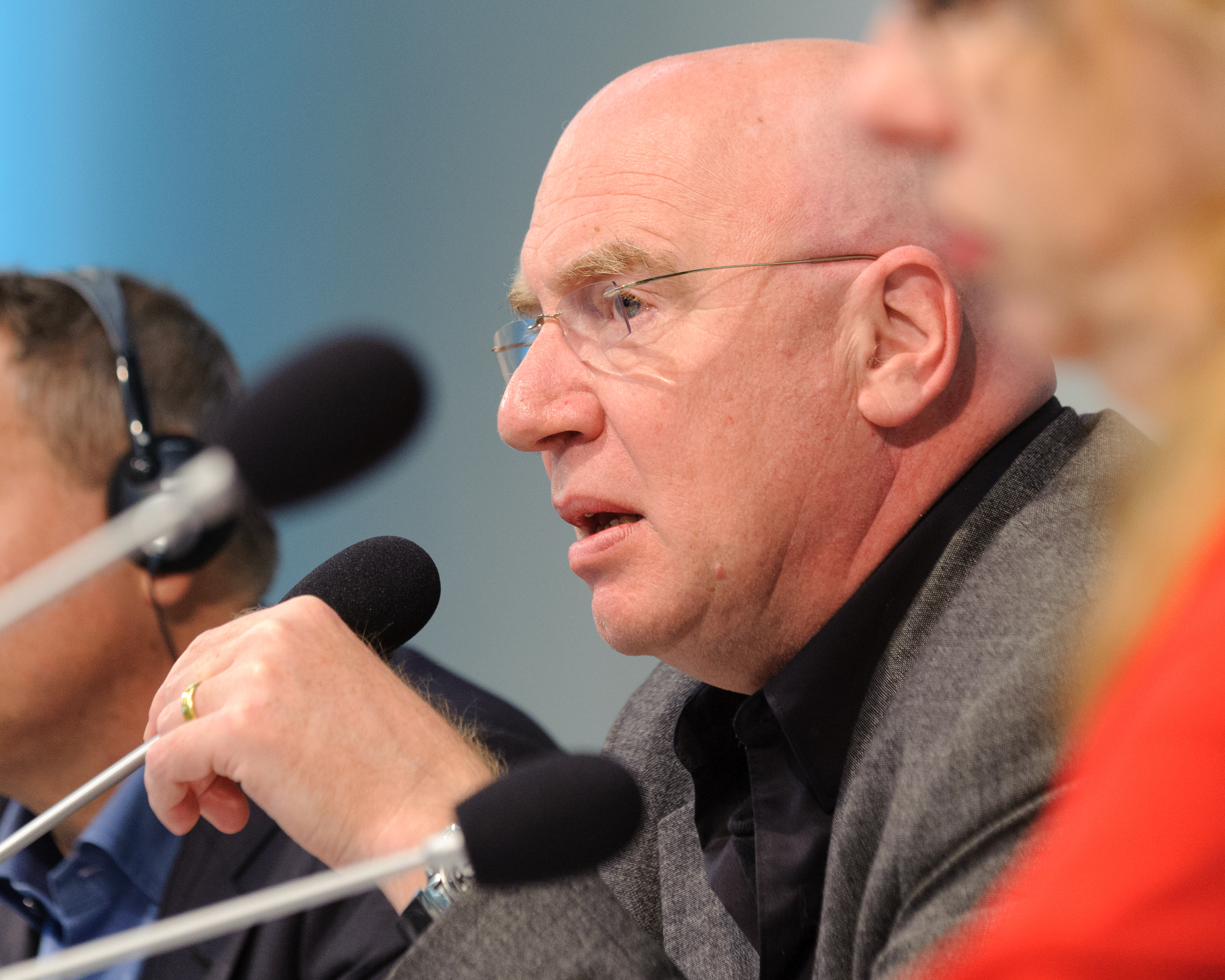
Strenger in Berlin, 2012

== Research on globalization and its psychological impact ==
From 2000 onward, Strenger researched the impact of globalization on personal identity and meaning. He wrote a number of papers and two books on the topic, The Designed Self and The Fear of Insignificance. He spoke regularly about globalisation and world-citizenship, among other issues, including at TEDX Jaffa 2012.

In his The Designed Self (2004) he argued that Generation X's experience of life was very different from that of earlier generation. No longer suffering from suffocating taboos, GenXers were faced with a fluid world and great pressure to succeed.

The self had become an endless experiment, and GenXers expected to have spectacular lives in which professional success needed to be combined with experimentation in the domains of sexuality, lifestyle and shaping the body almost at will. Strenger argued that one of the problems of this generation was that it no longer felt rooted in deep cultural traditions, and instead turned to popular culture for guidance. Strenger's account combined individual case-studies with interpretations coming from a variety of disciplines like psychoanalysis, existential psychology, sociology and cultural criticism.

Some critics saw the book as an innovative and thought-provoking interpretation of the experience and identity of a generation that had grown into the world of global markets and communication networks. Others thought that Strenger was too pluralist and open in his interpretive approach and that he did not offer an integrated theoretical perspective.

== Research on midlife ==
Strenger also researched a number of other implications of the changing global order. He proposed to rethink midlife transition in view of increased life expectancy, and argued that midlife change must become a cultural norm in "The Existential Necessity of Midlife-Change" a much-quoted article in the Harvard Business Review. This requires the ability to assess ones weaknesses and strength objectively to make realistic decisions, a process that he has called "active self-acceptance".

== The Fear of Insignificance: Searching for Meaning in the Twenty-first Century ==
In his The Fear of Insignificance: Searching for Meaning in the Twenty-first Century Strenger argued that a new species he calls Homo Globalis, defined by its intimate connection to the global infotainment network, has emerged. Homo Globalis lives in a culture that celebrates spectacular achievement and preaches that everything is possible, as reflected in Nike's slogan "Just do it!" Alternately, Homo Globalis seeks solace in pop-spirituality and scientifically unfounded self-help precepts, neither of which offer any lasting relief from the fear of insignificance.

Using findings of existential psychology, Strenger argued that it was becoming progressively more difficult for Homo Globalis to maintain stable self-esteem, because every achievement is compared to the spectacular success stories publicized by the media. Strenger attacked the fashionable relativism of pop-spirituality, claiming that this actually prevents Homo Globalis from attaining a stable worldview.

As an alternative to the myth of "Just do it" and the precepts of pop-spirituality, Strenger suggested a concept of "active self-acceptance", in which persons achieve a sense of selfhood and their personal mission through a sustained quest for self-knowledge. Strenger's position, while politically liberal, was culturally conservative, and his remedy for the malaise of Homo Globalis was a return to the ideal of liberal education. He claimed that only sustained intellectual investment in a reasonably based world-view can give Homo Globalis a stable sense of meaning and identity.

The Fear of Insignificance has been translated into a number of languages including French, Italian, Portuguese and Korean. Strenger wrote on the topic of The Fear of Insignificance in a blog called Homo Globalis at Psychology Today, and has given extensive interviews on the topic.

== Research on Jewish identity and world-citizenship ==
Strenger was interested in modern Jewish identity, particularly in modern Jewish Universalism, and has written about it in a variety of publications. In The Fear of Insignificance (2011) he has worked out a psychology of world-citizenship. To what extent are humans able to widen their ability for empathy and concern beyond the culture of their upbringing? He claimed that the development of modern Jewish Universalism provides an interesting paradigm for this identity, and has portrayed Sigmund Freud, Hannah Arendt, Isaiah Berlin, Leo Strauss and Philip Roth as examples. In his Israel, Einführung in ein schwieriges Land (Suhrkamp 2011), he has argued that Jewish Universalist ethics is currently in conflict with dominant nationalist tendencies in Israeli politics. In Freud's Legacy in the Global Era (2016) Strenger has further developed his analysis of world citizenship through his concept of "New Cosmopolitans", and has elaborated on Freud as a paradigm of Jewish Universalist identity.

== Political writing and views ==
Strenger was publicly involved in Israeli politics and culture from the late 1990s when he represented Israel's left in a weekly radio talk show, in 2003 elections he was on the strategy team of the Labor party. He joined the Permanent Monitoring Panel on Terrorism of the World Federation of Scientists in 2004, the Center for the Study of Terrorism at John Jay College at CUNY in 2012 and wrote academic analyses of the Middle Eastern conflict from the point of view of Existential psychology.

The German publisher Suhrkamp has published his psychopolitical analysis of Israeli politics and society, Israel, Einführung in ein schwieriges Land (Israel, Introduction to a difficult Country), and Strenger has given extensive interviews on Israeli politics in the German media. Strenger's central claim is that Israel must be understood as a belated country that is currently in a culture war about its identity, with central issues like the relation of religion and state as yet unsolved. He also analyzes the complex, guilt-ridden relation between Europe and Israel, and claims that the Middle Eastern conflict is, among others, intractable because of the exclusive claim of monotheistic religions to absolute truth.

From 2007, Strenger was a columnist for Israel's leading liberal newspaper Haaretz, and for Neue Zürcher Zeitung, and wrote occasionally in Britain's The Guardian,The New York Times and Foreign Policy and blogged on the Huffington Post.

Strenger was a proponent of the two-state solution, i.e. he claims that the only way to end the Middle Eastern Conflict is establishing a Palestinian state with East Jerusalem as its capital alongside Israel. His criticisms of Israel's settlement policies were often quite pronounced, and he saw Israel's failure to engage with the Arab League Peace Initiative as an indication of political and strategic short-sightedness. But since the end of 2011 he has expressed growing skepticism that the two state solution can still be implemented given Israel's move to the right and Palestinian's ineffective leadership.

Nevertheless, he also criticized Palestinian self-representation as pure victims, and called for responsible Palestinian leadership to move towards credible peace proposals. He also strongly attacked attempts to delegitimize Israel's existence.

Strenger wrote sharply critical analyses of the involvement of religion in Israeli politics and claimed that Israel needs to adopt the secular model of France and the US to avoid constant clashes and to stop what he saw as an ongoing culture war in Israel.

But Strenger was also critical of the failure of Israel's left to deal with the events leading from the end of the Oslo Process to the second Intifada and the rise of Hamas. He saw this failure as a symptom of what he calls the ‘Standard Left Explanatory System’ that evolved in Europe in the 1960s, which assumes that all ills in the non-Western world are a function of Western wrongdoing, and never ascribes responsibility to non-Western agents like Islamic countries and groupings.

Strenger described himself as a classical European Liberal, and claimed that his political views are application of this liberal position to Israeli politics and the Israel-Palestine conflict. Some of his critics from the Israeli right categorized him as belonging to the extreme left. Strenger was an advocate of a liberal form of Zionism reaching back to Ahad Ha'am and has developed this vision in an essay entitled Knowledge-Nation Israel and a number of opinion articles.

He believed that, as of 2015, there are three Israeli political parties which "are fully committed to Israel as a Western, liberal democracy with separation of state and religion and fully equal rights for all citizens independent of ethnicity and religion: The Zionist Union, Yesh Atid and Meretz...."

Strenger died on October 25, 2019, at his home in Tel Aviv.

== Books ==
Alongside numerous scientific papers, he was the author of eleven books on psychoanalysis, politics and liberalism, and individuality and meaning in a Global era, which were translated to various languages:

- Diese verdammten liberalen Eliten. Wer sie sind und warum wir sie brauchen. Suhrkamp-Verlag, Edition Suhrkamp, Berlin 2019, ISBN 978-3518074985.
- Abenteuer Freiheit – Ein Wegweiser für unsichere Zeiten. Suhrkamp, Berlin 2017, ISBN 978-3-518-07144-1.
- Freud’s Legacy in the Global Era. Routledge, London 2015, ISBN 978-1138840294.
- Zivilisierte Verachtung – Eine Anleitung zur Verteidigung unserer Freiheit. Suhrkamp, Berlin 2015, ISBN 978-3-518-07441-1.
- Israel – Einführung in ein schwieriges Land. Jüdischer Verlag, Berlin 2011, ISBN 978-3-633-54255-0.
- The Fear of Insignificance: Searching for Meaning in the Twenty-first Century. Palgrave-Mcmillan, New York 2011, ISBN 978-1138840294.
- Why won't you live twice? (with Arie Ruttenberg). Kinneret Publishing, Tel Aviv 2008.
- The Designed Self. Routledge, London 2004, ISBN 978-0881634198.
- The Quest for Voice in Contemporary Psychoanalysis. International Universities Press, Madison, CT 2002, ISBN 978-0823657629.
- Individuality, the Impossible Project. International Universities Press, Madison, CT 1998, ISBN 978-0823626250.
- Between Hermeneutics and Science: An Essay on the Epistemology of Psychoanalysis. International Universities Press, Madison, CT 1991, ISBN 978-0823604975.
