= Ute Frevert =

German historian

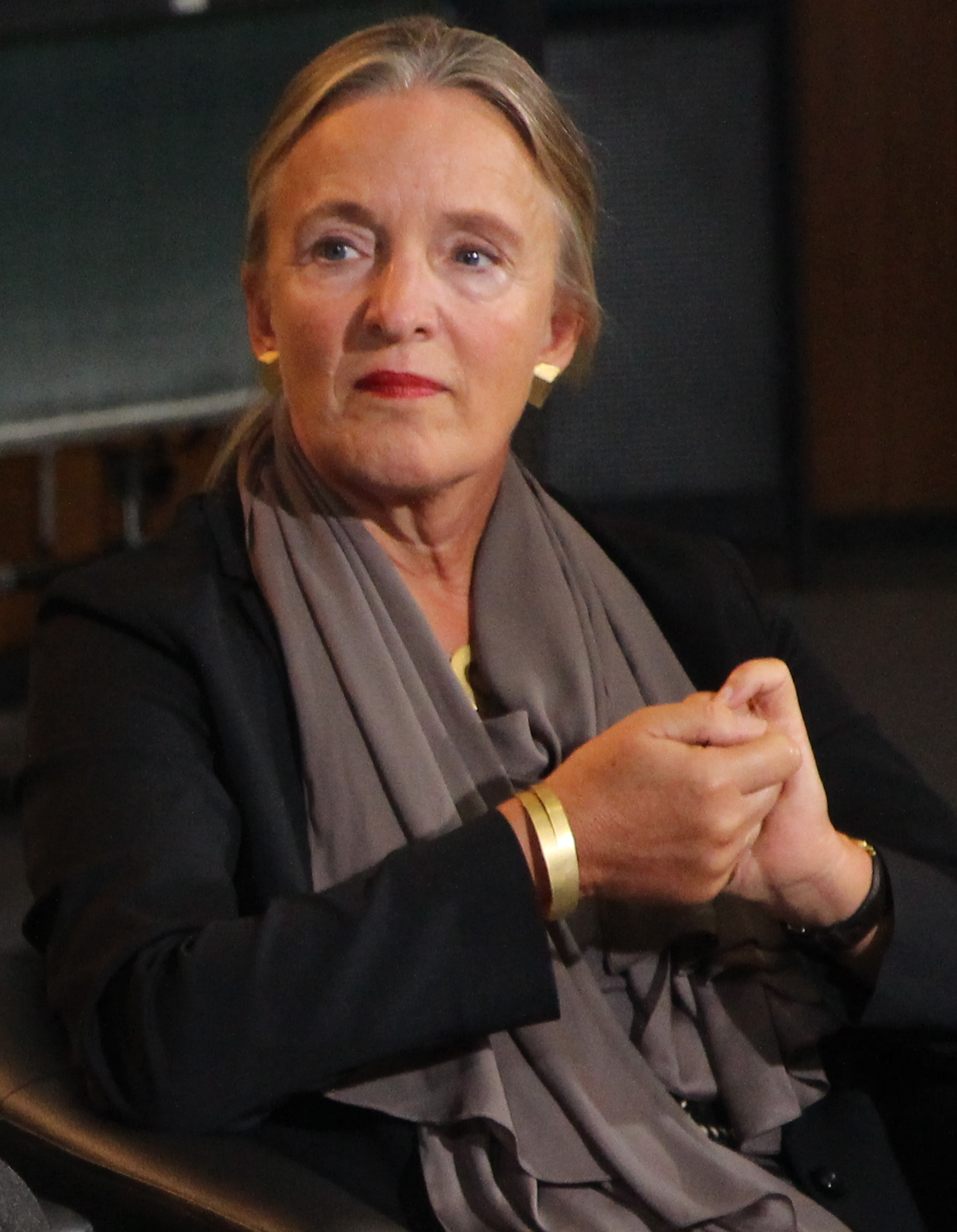
Frevert at the Deutscher Historikertag 2014

Ute Frevert (born 10 June 1954 in Schötmar, Bad Salzuflen, North Rhine-Westphalia) is a German historian. She is a specialist in modern and contemporary German history, as well as social and gender history. In January 2008, she was appointed managing director of the Max Planck Institute for Human Development and director of the Institute's Center for History of Emotions in Berlin.

== Education ==
From 1971 to 1977, Ute Frevert studied History and Social Sciences at the Universities of Münster and at London School of Economics and Political Science. She received her PhD from Bielefeld University in 1982 and was habilitated in 1989.

== Career and research ==
Frevert worked at several research institutions. She held research fellowships at Berlin Institute for Advanced Study from 1989 to 1990 and 2004–2005 and at Center for Advanced Study in the Behavioral Sciences (CASBS) at Stanford University from 2000 to 2001. She was professor for modern history at Free University of Berlin in 1991–1992 and at the University of Konstanz from 1992 to 1997. After being appointed professor for general history at Bielefeld University, she proceeded to hold a professorship for German history at Yale University. Since the winter semester 2008/2009 she is an honorary professor at the Friedrich-Meinecke-Institut at Free University of Berlin.

Frevert was a visiting professor at Hebrew University of Jerusalem in 1997, at Dartmouth College in New Hampshire in 2002 at the Institute for Human Sciences in 2003 as well as the Fondation Maison des Sciences de l’Homme.

Her research has focused on social and cultural history, evaluating gender relations, and the impact of policies, like military conscription and customs like dueling have impacted the human experience.

== Awards and honours ==
- 1998: Gottfried Wilhelm Leibniz Prize
- 2004: Member of the Academy of Sciences Leopoldina
- 2009: Member of the Royal Prussian Academy of Sciences
- 2013: Fellow of the British Academy
- 2016: Officer's Cross of the Order of Merit of the Federal Republic of Germany
- 2018: Honorary degree from the University of Tampere, Finland
- 2020: Sigmund Freud Prize

== Selected works ==
=== Author ===
- A Nation in Barracks: Modern Germany, Military Conscription and Civil Society. Translated by Andrew Boreham. New York: Berg, 2004. ISBN 978-1-85973-881-8
- Men of Honour: A Social and Cultural History of the Duel. Translated by Anthony Williams. Cambridge, MA: Blackwell Publishers, 1995. ISBN 978-0-7456-1197-6
- Women in German History: From Bourgeois Emancipation to Sexual Liberation. Translated by Stuart McKinon-Evans. New York: Berg, 1989. ISBN 978-0-85496-233-4
- Emotions in History – Lost and Found. Budapest: Central European University Press, 2011 ISBN 978-615-5053-34-4
- Learning How to Feel. Children's Literature and Emotional Socialization, 1870–1970. Oxford: Oxford University Press, 2014. ISBN 978-0-19-968499-1
- The Politics of Humiliation: A Modern History. Oxford: Oxford University Press, 2020. ISBN 978-0-19-882031-4

=== Editor ===
- Moral economies (Geschichte und Gesellschaft: Sonderheft No. 26). Göttingen: Vandenhoeck & Ruprecht, 2019. ISBN 978-3-525-36426-0

=== Thesis ===
- Frevert, Ute (1984). Krankheit als politisches Problem, 1770–1880 : soziale Unterschichten in Preussen zwischen medizinischer Polizei und staatlicher Sozialversicherung (in German). Göttingen: Vandenhoeck & Ruprecht. ISBN 3-525-35721-4. OCLC 11085969.
