= EuroMed Permanent University Forum =

- Abbreviation: EPUF
- Named after: Euro-Mediterranean region
- Formation: 2006; 20 years ago
- Founded at: Tampere, Finland
- Type: International non-governmental nonprofit organization
- Headquarters: Tarragona, Spain
- Members: 100+ (2014)
- Official languages: English, French, Arabic
- President: Lluís Arola; University of Rovira i Virgili
- Main organ: General Assembly

The EuroMed Permanent University Forum (EPUF) is an international academic network established in 2006 in Tampere, Finland. It aims to foster cooperation among higher education institutions in the Euro-Mediterranean region. The organization is headquartered in Tarragona, Spain.

== History and mission ==
The EPUF's activities have been described as reflecting the principles of the Barcelona Declaration and the Euro-Mediterranean Partnership. The forum states that it supports cooperation in higher education across participating countries in Europe and the Mediterranean basin.

== Membership ==
The EPUF includes more than 100 universities and research institutions from 29 countries across Europe and the Mediterranean basin.

== Activities ==
The EPUF's stated areas of work include academic mobility, harmonization of educational standards, quality assurance, governance and training, human resource development, and digital education. Some program descriptions are aligned with the United Nations Sustainable Development Goals.

== Partnerships and programmes ==
The EPUF collaborates with international bodies such as the Anna Lindh Euro-Mediterranean Foundation for the Dialogue Between Cultures and has participated in programmes like Erasmus Mundus and TEMPUS.

== Organization ==
The forum operates through working groups focused on specific areas of interest. The Executive Secretariat Office is hosted by the University of Rovira i Virgili in Tarragona, which coordinates the EPUF's operations.

== See also ==
- Union for the Mediterranean
- European Institute of the Mediterranean
