= Maha Laziri =

Moroccan education activist

- Born: Maha Laziri; Morocco

Maha Laziri (born 1991) is a Moroccan education activist. She is the founder of the NGO Teach4Morocco. In 2014 Arabian Business ranked her 17th in their list of the 100 most powerful Arab women.
