= Stephen Holmes (political scientist) =

American political scientist (born 1948)

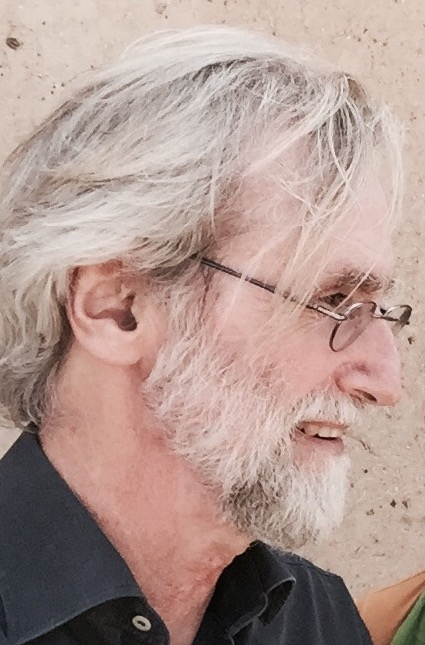
- Born: February 21, 1948 (age 78)
- Occupations: Political scientist, legal scholar

Stephen Holmes (born February 21, 1948) is an American political scientist who is the Walter E. Meyer Professor of Law at New York University.

He received a B.A. in 1969 from Denison University and a Ph.D. in 1976 from Yale University, where he won the John Addison Porter Prize for that year. After joining faculty at the University of Chicago as an Associate Professor of Political Science in 1985, Holmes became a tenured Professor of Political Science and Law at the university's law school in 1989. He joined the faculty at Princeton University from 1997-2000 as a Professor of Politics before his present post.

== Media commentary ==
In 2004, he was interviewed in the BBC documentary The Power of Nightmares: The Rise of the Politics of Fear.

== Selected publications ==
- Benjamin Constant and the Making of Modern Liberalism (1984, Yale University Press, ISBN 9780300030839) - on Benjamin Constant, translated into French
- The Anatomy of Antiliberalism (1993, Harvard University Press, ISBN 9780674031807) - translated into German, Italian and Chinese
- Passions and Constraint: On the Theory of Liberal Democracy (1995, University of Chicago Press, ISBN 9780226349688) - translated into Italian
- The Cost of Rights: Why Liberty Depends on Taxes (1999, with Cass R. Sunstein, Norton, ISBN 9780393046700)- translated into Italian, Polish and Chinese
- The Matador’s Cape: America’s Reckless Response to Terror (2007, Cambridge University Press, ISBN 9780521875165)
- The Beginning of Politics : Power in the Biblical Book of Samuel (Princeton University Press, 2017)
- The Light that Failed. A Reckoning (2019, with Ivan Krastev, Allen Lane/Penguin, ISBN 9780241345702) - on illusionary expectations of liberalism translated into German
