= Evelin Lindner =

German academic (born 1954)

Evelin G. Lindner PhD (Dr.med.), PhD (Dr.psychol.)
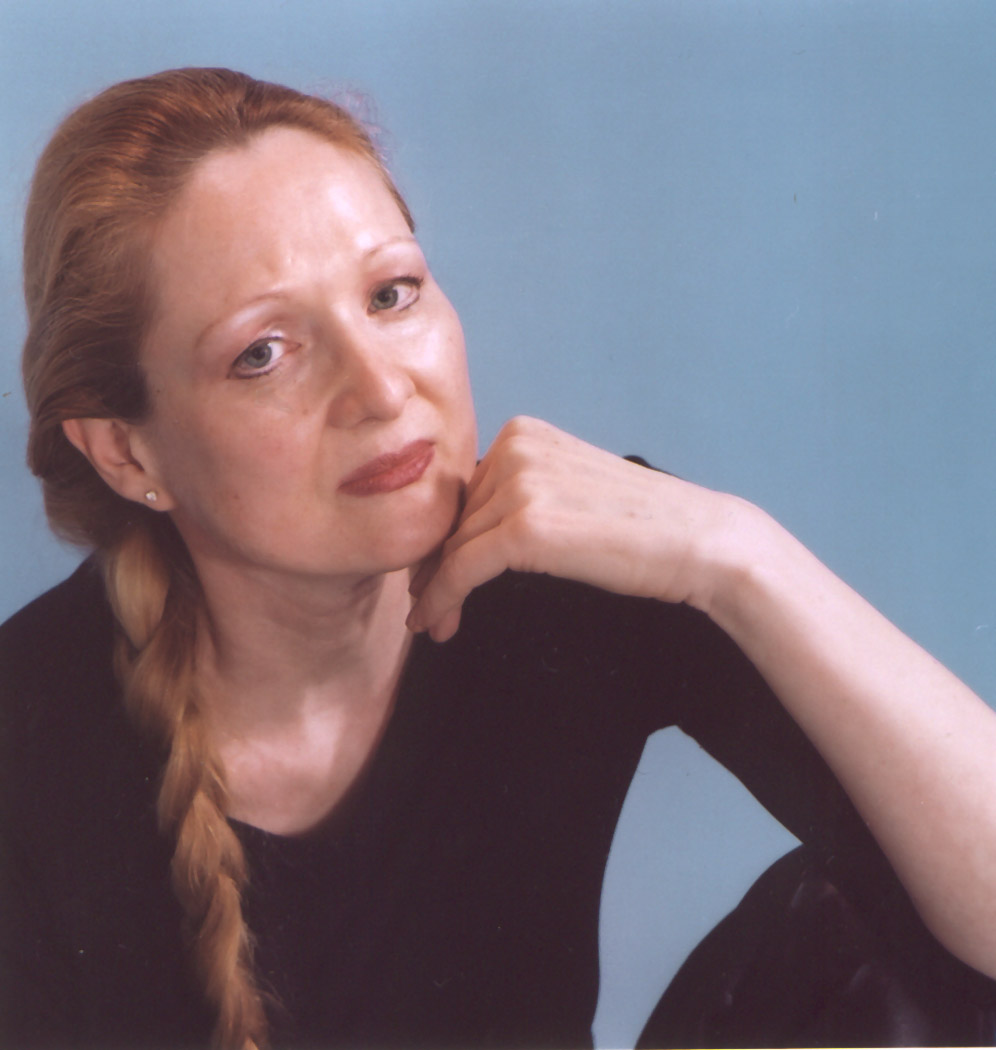
- Lindner in 2001
- Born: Evelin Gerda Lindner; May 13, 1954 (age 72); Hameln, Germany
- Occupations: Physician, Dr. med. (1994); Psychologist, Dr. psychol. (2001))
- Scientific career
- Fields: Research on human dignity and humiliation
- Website: www.humiliationstudies.org

Evelin Gerda Lindner (born May 13, 1954) is a German-Norwegian medical doctor, psychologist, transdisciplinary scholar and author who is known for her theory of humiliation.

Lindner is originally a physician and a clinical psychologist, and holds doctorates in both psychological medicine and social psychology. Her research focuses on human dignity, and she believes that the humiliation of honor and dignity may be among the strongest obstacles on the way to a decent world community. She founded the Human Dignity and Humiliation Studies network. Born in Germany, she is now mainly based in Norway, where she has partially lived since 1977. She has also lived in a number of other countries, including Egypt during most of the 1980s, and is an advocate of global citizenship.

== Early life and education ==
Evelin Lindner was born in Hameln, Germany in 1954, into a family that was deeply scarred by the two World Wars, particularly World War II. Her parents were displaced from Silesia in 1946 to Lower Saxony, which later became part of West Germany. She has stated that her family's traumatic experiences have formed the background of her work.

She graduated in psychology in 1978, and in medicine in 1984, both from the University of Hamburg. She has also studied law and sinology at the Goethe University Frankfurt and philosophy at the University of Hamburg. In 1994, she obtained her first doctorate, in Medicine (Dr. med.) from the University of Hamburg. Her thesis addressed the topic of quality of life in a comparative manner, examining the notion of a "good life" in Egypt and in Germany. In 1997 she became a research fellow at the University of Oslo Department of Psychology, where she obtained her second doctorate, in psychology, in 2001.

She speaks English, German, Norwegian and French fluently and is familiar with a number of other languages, among others, Egyptian Arabic, modern Hebrew, Russian, Chinese, Japanese, Indonesian, Swedish, Danish, Dutch, Spanish, and Portuguese.

== Work ==
Her global life and work started in 1974, first working as a psychologist and psychological counselor and later giving seminars and talks all around the world. She has lived in many countries within Africa, Asia, Europe, and America, among others for longer periods in Norway (regularly since 1977), Germany (regularly since 1974), Egypt (1984–1991), Switzerland (regularly since 2000), France (regularly since 2001), Belgium (1984–1991), the Middle East (regularly since 1975), Somalia (1998), the Great Lakes in Africa (1999), Thailand, Indonesia, Malaysia, Burma (1981), China (regularly since 1983), Japan (2004–2007), New Zealand (1983), Australia (2007, 2011), the United States (regularly since 1982). One of her main bases is Norway since 1977. (Marriage to a Norwegian in 1981, divorced in 1987.)

In 1993 she founded the NGO "Better Global Understanding" in Hamburg, where she organized a peace festival under the motto "Global Responsibility", attended by more than 20,000 people. In 1994, she was a candidate in the 1994 European Parliament election.

In 2001, Lindner began to develop the Human Dignity and Humiliation Studies network (HumanDHS), and in 2003 her longtime collaborator, the relational-cultural theorist Linda Hartling, joined her in her work. HumanDHS is a global transdisciplinary network and fellowship with more than 1,000 members and in the meantime over 8,000 interested persons on the address list.

Since 2001, she has been affiliated with Columbia University's Advanced Consortium on Cooperation, Conflict, and Complexity in New York and since 2003 she has also been affiliated with the Fondation Maison des Sciences de l'Homme in Paris. (see external links, Dignity Conferences 2003 and 2004)

Since 2003, she is the main organizer of two Dignity Conferences each year, one conference in a different world region and the other each December at Columbia University in New York City.

In 2011, the World Dignity University initiative together with Dignity Press were launched, and Dignity Press has so far (01/2020) published more than thirty books addressing human dignity and humiliation from a variety of perspectives.

In 2015, 2016, and 2017 Evelin Lindner was nominated for the Nobel Peace Prize by a group of critical scientists in Norway. In her 2017 book, Honor, Humiliation, and Terror: An Explosive Mix – And How We Can Defuse It with Dignity, she asked, "[w]hat about leaving behind our identification with ourselves and identity with life in general? What about lifeism rather than humanism, humanitarian, or humanistic?"

== Books and awards ==
Evelin Lindner has received several awards.

In 2006, she was the recipient of the "2006 Swiss Association of Applied Psychology (SBAP) Award for Applied Psychology", for her unique research and independent project management skills, as well as for her advocacy for humanity in a global society. In 2009, she received the Prisoner's Testament Award in Norway. Her first book, Making Enemies: Humiliation and International Conflict (2006), has been honored as an "Outstanding Academic Title" by the journal Choice for 2007.

In 2009 she published her second book, Emotion and Conflict: How Human Rights Can Dignify Emotion and Help Us Wage Good Conflict.

Her third book, Gender, Humiliation, and Global Security was published in 2010 with a foreword by Desmond Tutu, and was highly recommended by Choice.

== Selected publications ==
- Chipamong Chowdhury, Michael Britton, and Linda Hartling (Editors) (2019): Human Dignity: Practices, Discourses, and Transformations. Essays on Dignity Studies in Honor of Evelin G. Lindner, Lake Oswego, OR: Dignity Press, 2019, ISBN 978-1-937570-92-7
- A Dignity Economy: Creating an Economy Which Serves Human Dignity and Preserves Our Planet, Lake Oswego, OR: World Dignity University Press, 2012, ISBN 978-1-937570-03-3.
- Gender, Humiliation, and Global Security: Dignifying Relationships from Love, Sex, and Parenthood to World Affairs, with a foreword by Desmond Tutu, Praeger, ABC-CLIO, 2010, ISBN 0-313-35485-5
- Emotion and Conflict: How Human Rights Can Dignify Emotion and Help Us Wage Good Conflict, with a foreword by Morton Deutsch, Praeger Security International, Greenwood, 2009 ISBN 978-0-313-37237-7
- Making Enemies: Humiliation and International Conflict, with a foreword by Morton Deutsch, Praeger Security International, Greenwood, 2006, ISBN 978-027599109-8
- The Psychology of Humiliation. Somalia, Rwanda / Burundi, and Hitler's Germany, Oslo: Department of Psychology, University of Oslo (dissertation, dr. psychol.), 2000 ISBN 82-569-1817-9
- Women in the Global Village: Increasing Demand for Traditional Communication Patterns. In Breines, Ingeborg, Gierycz, Dorota, & Reardon, Betty (Ed.), Towards a Women's Agenda for a Culture of Peace. Paris: UNESCO, 1999, ISBN 978-923-103559-3
