= Euro-Mediterranean region =

Region encompassing all the European countries and the countries on the Mediterranean Rim

The Euro-Mediterranean region encompasses all the European countries and the countries on the Mediterranean Rim.

== See also ==
- Mediterranean Basin

== Bibliography ==
- Stefania Panebianco, New Euro-Mediterranean Cultural Identity, Routledge, 2003
- Daniel Müller-Jentsch, Deeper integration and trade in services in the Euro-Mediterranean region, Business & Economics, 2005
