= Work–family enrichment =

Work–family enrichment or work–family facilitation refers to a process at the work-life interface whereby experience or participation in one role increases the quality or performance in the other role.

Enrichment of facilitation can occur when involvement in one role leads to benefits, resources, and/or personality enrichment which then may improve performance or involvement in the other role. Enrichment can occur bi-directionally such as work-family enrichment or family-work enrichment. Work–family enrichment occurs when involvement in work provides benefits such as skill growth, or changing of mood to be more positive, which has a positive effect on the family. Family-work enrichment occurs when involvement within the family results in the creation of a positive mood, feeling of support, or feeling of success which can help that individual to cope better, more efficient, more confidence, or recharged for one's role at work.

Work–family enrichment has been shown to affect a range of outcomes including, but not limited to, job and family satisfaction.

== See also ==
- Partner effects
- Shared parenting
- Spillover-crossover model
- Work–family conflict
