= The Second Shift =

1989 book by Arlie Russell Hochschild

The Second Shift: Working Parents and the Revolution at Home
- First cover
- Author: Arlie Russell Hochschild with Anne Machung
- Language: English
- Genre: Nonfiction social science
- Publisher: Viking Penguin
- Publication date: 1989, with reissues in 1997 and 2012
- Publication place: United States
- Media type: Print (Hardback & Paperback)
- ISBN: 9780143120339 (2012 release)

The Second Shift: Working Parents and the Revolution at Home is a book by Arlie Russell Hochschild with Anne Machung, first published in 1989. It was reissued in 2012 with updated data. In the text, Hochschild investigates and portrays the double burden experienced by late-20th-century employed mothers.

== Summary ==
Coined after Arlie Hochschild's 1989 book, the term "second shift" describes the labor performed at home in addition to the paid work performed in the formal sector. In The Second Shift, Hochschild and her research associates "interviewed fifty couples very intensively" and observed in a dozen homes throughout the 1970s and 1980s in an effort to explore the "leisure gap" between men and women. Through the depictions of couples' day-to-day practices, Hochschild derived three constructs in regard to marital roles that she observed during her research: transitional, traditional, and egalitarian. The traditional woman "wants to identify with her activities at home (as a wife, a mother, a neighborhood mom)". The egalitarian female partner "wants to identify with the same spheres her husband does, and to have an equal amount of power in the marriage". The transitional woman falls in between, blending the traditional and egalitarian ideologies. Most of the chapters are dedicated to the routines of a different couple, delving into the apparent and unnoticed motivations behind their behaviors. Similar to earlier research that is cited in the book, The Second Shift found that women still take care of most of the household and child care responsibilities despite their entrance into the labor force. The "second shift" affected the couples, as they reported feelings of guilt and inadequacy, marital tension, and a lack of sexual interest and sleep. On the other hand, Hochschild shared the stories of a few men who equally shared the burden of domestic work and child care with their wives, showing that while this scenario is uncommon, it is a reality for some couples. Hochschild's research also presented a clear division between the ideology preferences of the genders and social classes: the working class and men preferred the traditional idea; the middle class and women preferred the egalitarian one.

== Reception ==
Reviewing the book for The New York Times in 1989, Robert Kuttner wrote that the topic is "a standard feminist plaint", but commended the book for "the texture of the reporting and the subtlety of the insights".

== See also ==
- Double burden, term for similar observations during mid-20th century
- Occupational health psychology
- Partner effects
- Reproductive labor
- Time poverty
- Work–family balance in the United States
