= Spillover-crossover model =

The Spillover-Crossover model is used in psychological research to examine to impact of the work domain on the home domain, and consequently, the transference of work-related emotions from the employee to others at home (particularly the partner). The ways in which well-being can be transferred have been categorized into two different mechanisms (;): spillover and crossover.

== Spillover ==
Spillover concerns the transmission of states of well-being from one domain of life to another. This is a process that takes place at the intra-individual level, thus within one person but across different domains. The experiences that are transferred from one domain to the other can be either negative or positive.

=== Work-family conflict: negative spillover ===
Spillover effects apply to situations in which there is a form of inter-role conflict. That is, being involved in a work-role may put strains on the family role, or vice versa. This implies that an additional categorization can be made between two different types of inter-role conflict. Firstly, work-family conflict (WFC) refers to a situation where the pressures related to the work-role have an unfavorable impact on the family role. Second, family-work conflict (FWC) refers to a situation where the pressures of the family role have an unfavorable impact on the role individuals have at work. An example of a (WFC-) spillover effect would be one in which an individual experiences a need to compromise on leisure time (i.e. private domain) due to work overload (i.e. work domain). Up till now, numerous studies have found evidence for spillover effects (for a meta-analysis, see;).

==== Predicting negative spillover ====
Both dispositional variables (e.g., Type A personality, negative affectivity;), as well as work characteristics have been shown to play a role in work-family conflict (;). Different job demands have been shown to predict WFC, including work-role overload (e.g.;) and work pressure (e.g.,), but also an unfavorable working time schedule (;) and emotional job demands.

=== Work-family enrichment/facilitation: positive spillover ===
Apart from the hampering, negative effects of WFC/FWC-conflicts, positive effects may also occur. This process is called work-family enrichment or facilitation.

==== Predicting positive spillover ====
Research has shown that, in general, positive spillover is positively related to job resources (e.g., social support, autonomy, feedback;). Also, positive spillover has been related positively to job performance and other outcomes.

=== Explaining spillover ===
One theoretical framework that has been used to explain negative spillover is called the role scarcity hypothesis. The main argument here is that since people have a limited, fixed amount of resources (e.g., energy, time), problems may arise when different roles draw on these same resources. For example, when both family and work roles draw on the scarce resource of time, it is likely that one of these roles is compromised due to a lack of available time. A different framework, the role expansion hypothesis, has been used to explain positive spillover. According to this hypothesis, individuals generate resources (e.g., positive mood, skills) and opportunities from the multiple roles they are engaged in. These, in turn, can be used in both life domains to improve functioning and promote growth.

== Crossover ==
In the process of crossover, the transmission of states of well-being takes place between closely related persons. This process is characterized by transmission on the inter-individual level (Bakker, Demerouti & Burke, 2009). In other words, the crossover is a dyadic process where states of well-being ‘cross over’ to another individual. Research has shown that this process can entail both the transfer of negative, as well as positive experiences. An example of a crossover effect would be one in which an individual transfers feelings of stress or fatigue to his/her partner. Research studies have shown this effect to occur between partners. For example, a study by Demerouti, Bakker and Schaufeli (2005-) indicated that partners of employees suffering from burnout may actually develop burnout themselves.

=== Predicting crossover ===
It has been shown that crossover is more likely to occur in situations where individuals pay close attention to others. Also, the crossover is more likely when individuals have self-construals that are focused on being interrelated to others, rather than being unique and independent. Sensitivity and susceptibility to emotional stimuli may also predict crossover (e.g.).

=== Explaining crossover ===
Emphatic processes, common stressors and communication/interaction have been identified by Westman (2006 -) as potential mechanisms explaining the crossover effect. Finally, the transmission of states of well-being may be mediated by interaction and communication, such as social undermining or a lack of social support.

== Combining spillover and crossover: The Spillover-Crossover model ==
In the Spillover-Crossover model (SCM), research and theories on spillover and crossover are combined, resulting in a model that proposes the following: first, experiences in the work domain spill over to the family domain (;). Consequently, through social interaction, the experiences cross over from one partner to the other. As explained in the previous sections, this process can concern both positive and negative experiences. Various studies have yielded results that support the SCM. Yet, these research efforts are largely devoted to studying negative spillover and crossover (for an overview, see). One example is the study of Bakker, Demerouti and Dollard, showing that work roles interfered with family roles when work overload and emotional demands increased. In turn, the intimate partner experienced a higher level of demands at home (e.g., an overload of household tasks), as a result of the negative behaviors of the employee. In the end, the partner experienced higher levels of exhaustion.

== Practical implications ==
One of the most important implications of the SCM is that employers should not only focus on interventions that mitigate family demands that conflict with work roles (e.g., child care programs, alternative work schedules), but also on practices that impact working conditions (i.e. job demands and resources) and how they influence family life.
