= Double burden =

Workload of people who both earn money and have significant domestic responsibilities

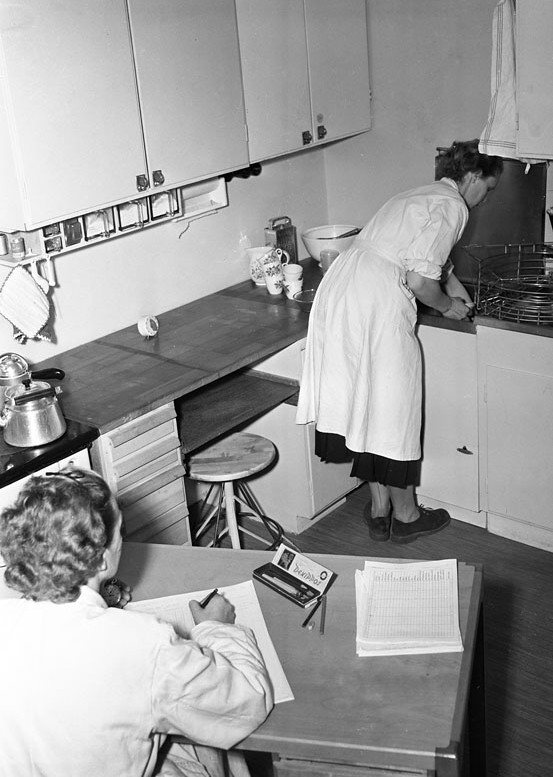
A woman cooks, supervised by a teacher, in a domestic economy institute in Stockholm, Sweden. (1950)

A double burden (also called double day, second shift, and double duty) is the workload of people who work to earn money, but who are also responsible for significant amounts of unpaid domestic labor. This phenomenon is also known as the Second Shift as in Arlie Hochschild's book of the same name. In couples where both partners have paid jobs, women often spend significantly more time than men on household chores and caring work, such as childrearing or caring for sick family members, while men spend significantly more time doing paid work. On average, both partners spend roughly the same amount of time working and on leisure. This outcome is determined in large part by traditional gender roles that have been accepted by society over time. Labor market constraints also play a role in determining who does the bulk of unpaid work.

Efforts have been made to document the effects of this double burden on couples placed in such situations. Many studies have traced the effects of the gendered division of labor, and in most cases there was a notable difference between the time men and women contribute to unpaid labor.

== Unequal work burdens around the world ==
=== In the industrialized world ===
==== Pre-World War II ====
The traditional female homemaker–male breadwinner model characterized female employment prior to World War II. At the turn of the 20th century in the continental United States, only 18 percent of women over the age of 15 reported receiving income from non-farm employment. These women were typically young, single, white, and native-born. In contrast, married women in the non-farm labor force were "predominantly blacks or immigrants and very poor". Working mothers often exited the labor force once their children were old enough to earn money.

The outpouring of occupational opportunities in the early 1920s, such as in "cafeterias, nurseries, laundries and other facilities seemed to release women from domestic chores and freed them to participate fully in the sphere of production."

This migration of women into the workforce shook the traditional ideology of gender roles and was the catalyst to the double burden becoming noticeable. The 1930s "encouraged women to fulfill what Stalin termed the "great and honorable duty that nature has given" them. Evident in the Soviet Union, "an officially sponsored cult of motherhood, buttressed by anti-abortion legislation" accompanied by a "depression of living standards" led to industry's immense demand for laborers which got women into the industrial workforce in unprecedented numbers". Urban women thus found themselves assuming the "double burden" (also known as the "double shift") of waged work outside the home and the lion's share of unpaid labor within it." The Second World War is typically seen as a catalyst for increasing female employment. Best exemplified by Rosie the Riveter propaganda of an efficient, patriotic, woman worker, World War II increased demand for female labor to replace that of the "16 million men mobilized to serve in the Armed Forces". While a substantial number of women worked in war factories, the majority of jobs were in the service sector. This caused the gendered expectations for that time to be altered and roles to be both tested and reassigned for the incoming decades.

==== Post-World War II ====
The post-World War II period is marked by relatively high levels of female participation in the workforce, particularly in industrialized countries. Although a large proportion of women exited the workforce immediately following World War II, the idea of working-class women was able to take root and normalize. "In 2001, 47 percent of U.S. workers were women, and 61 percent of women over the age of 15 were in the labor force." Besides an increased demand for women's labor, other factors contributed to the growth of their participation, such as more educational opportunities and later marriage and childbearing ages.

The idea of the double burden is more evolved with the times concerning both sexes and their newfound roles. The role of a provider and caregiver is sometimes expected of women, but as more women enter the workforce, an 'independent' ideology seems to take effect and forces some women to decide between a career and family. Some may choose strictly one or the other, others may choose to carry the burden of both lifestyles. Some "modern men tend to believe in the principle of equal sharing of domestic labor, but fail to actually live up to that belief." The constant tug of war regarding one's time and where it could, should but will be spent creates a new speed bump that is a little bit higher than the previous ones. Modern times illuminate the dilemma that many dual-income couples face when trying to reconcile unpaid domestic work and paid employment. The burden of encompassing both ideologies plays a toll on both sexes in today's societies.

=== Latin America ===
Due to globalization in the past thirty years, the power of the unskilled worker has diminished, and thus, the informal economy has flourished. In Latin America, there is an abundant number of workers to help out with domestic work, and consequently, domestic service is cheap, diminishing the family tensions surrounding the issue of domestic work. Currently, about half of the working population is employed in the informal sector, leading to "unemployment, underemployment, and social exclusion". Because of this, there has been a serious delay in providing welfare for the care of children and the elderly because the pressure to provide aid for working families is minimal. In addition, domestic workers, many of them women, often leave their countries to work in the informal sector in northern countries in order to increase income for their families, also delaying the pressure for governments to provide aid to these families. However, there has been a change since the 2000s in thinking about unpaid work due to the influx of paid jobs for women and the shortage of people available to do domestic work.

Although the increase in jobs for women has had benefits in policy changes for families with working parents, there have been debates about the conditions of the workplaces. In Mexico, there is an influx of the maquila industry, which produces products that will be sold in the developed nations. The mostly female workforce is often exploited by having unsafe working conditions, and stress is a major cause of many illnesses of these women.

Another increasing issue is the rise in conditional cash transfer programs in Latin America, such as the Oportunidades program in Mexico. Although this program is meant to provide poor families with an increase in income, the conditionalities has led to a time poverty for the family members who are in charge of fulfilling the conditions, most oftentimes the woman. This has increased the inequality of work burden within the family.

=== Western Europe ===
Since the 1960s, Western Europe has been participating in a series of political debates to increase women's rights in the workforce. In the 2000s, there has been a change from considering women's rights to a mother's rights, focusing on the rights of pregnant women as well as mothers. However, there have been issues with creating laws specifically for mothers. There is still the inherent gender bias that women are the ones to care for children.

Some parts of Western Europe, especially Scandinavian countries, have been creating family-friendly policies that have aided them in equalizing the gender difference in participation in the work force. Nordic countries have the highest female participation rates in the work force in the world and salary differences are among the lowest. Government aid in providing care to the elderly and the young have enabled women in Scandinavia to be a part of the working population at nearly as high a rate as men. Examples of government aid include paid parental leave and benefits and post maternity re-entry programs. Such programs have led to a greater participation of women in the workforce, as well as a higher birth rate, and a robust economy.

=== Eastern Europe ===
Under communism, everyone was guaranteed employment. However, women suffered the double burden of paid and unpaid work, leading to lower birth rates. The commitment to social equality and the issue of declining birth rates allowed women to have some rights, such as child care and child allowances. For example, in the Soviet Union, maternity leave was extended to three years and part-time work was introduced. With the collapse of communism, many of these rights have been revoked due to the new largely male oriented democracy that has been put in place. Although there has been an increase in female workers, their need for welfare support such as child care has not been met, and has been ignored.

=== Asia ===
In Western and Southern Asia, women represent only a third of the work force. Many of them, even women in more modernized Asian countries, are involved in the informal sector, in traditional jobs for women, such as caring or teaching, without benefits such as employee health insurance or pension plans.

The issue of the double burden is exacerbated in Asian countries due to the large cultural norm of women doing care work held by both men and women. In many developed countries, women drop out of work when they have children in order to have more time to take care of them.

In countries where women have to do paid work in order to feed their family, there is a lack of regulation and safety standards regarding female workers due to the large amount of informal work available. In Thailand for example, due to the severe economic crisis in 1997, many women have jobs in the informal industry, and often do home-based work so that they can do their domestic jobs concurrently with their paid jobs. This increases the work intensity by women doing more than one job at a time, and has been shown to have deteriorating effects on women's health.

== Causes ==
=== Gender ideology ===
"Gender ideologies are linked to beliefs about appropriate behaviour for men and women". Socialization plays a major role in determining gender ideologies and what's valued in one time and culture may not necessarily transcend to another. Traditional gender ideologies have contributed to the double burden because it posits women as caretakers, men as providers, and each gender occupying their own sphere of influence. Although research has shown that attitudes about gender roles have become more egalitarian over the past few decades, "these changes in gender attitudes have not been accompanied by corresponding changes in the allocation of housework".

=== Labor market constraints ===
Despite women's increasing participation in the work force, a gender division of labor persists. There are a number of constraints in the labor market that contribute to the double burden. "Women are disproportionately represented in informal work and concentrated among lower-quality jobs within self-employment." The informal market is generally precarious and characterized by low wages, few benefits, and a lack of social protections that are offered in the formal market. Even within the formal market, there is occupational segregation and a gender wage gap. Occupational segregation can be either horizontal or vertical: horizontal segregation limits women to certain sectors and occupations, while vertical segregation restricts them to particular positions within occupational hierarchies. Men and women are even found at different levels of the occupational hierarchy. The "glass ceiling" is the relative absence of women in senior or managerial positions due to institutional barriers and norms. Even in female-dominated occupations, men often occupy the more skilled and better paid positions.

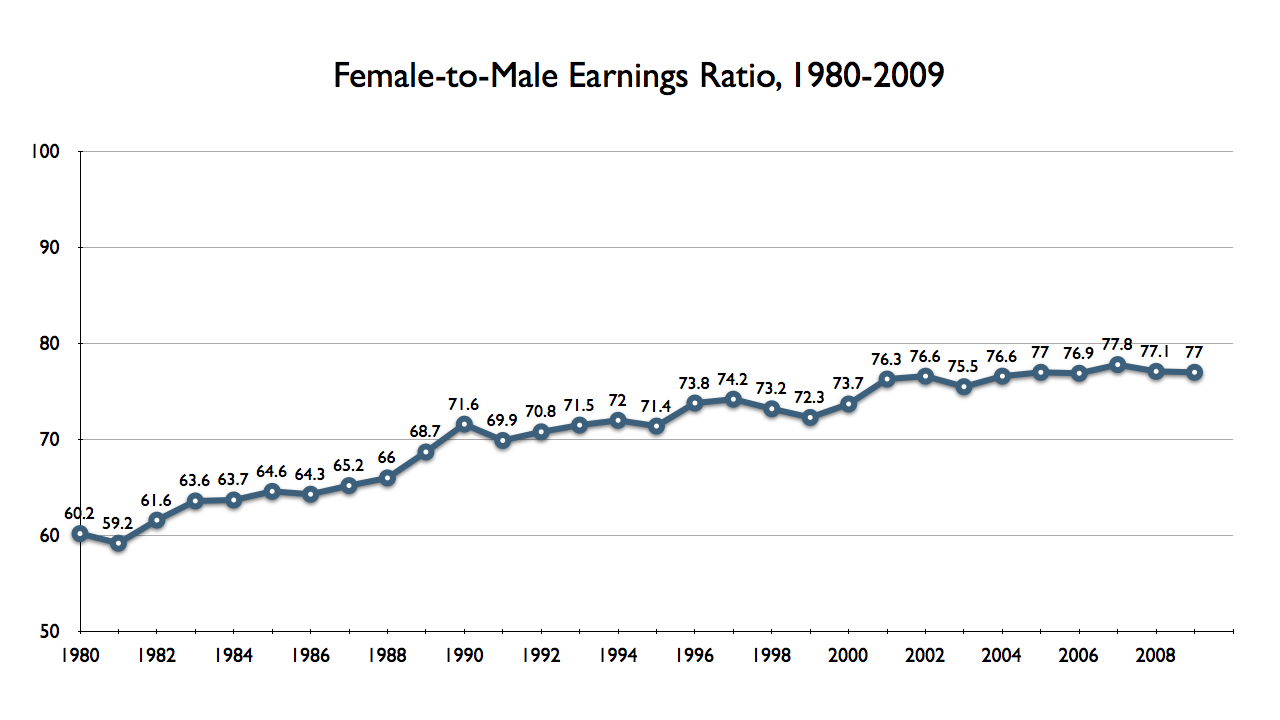
US Gender pay gap, 1980–2009.001

The gender wage gap is a possible consequence of occupational segregation. The gender wage gap is the "difference between wages earned by women and men". In 2008, globally, men were estimated to earn 16.5 per cent more than women. The gender wage gap is narrowing, but progress remains slow. Additionally, the narrowing of the gender wage gap may be attributed to a decrease in men's wages instead of an increase in women's wages. "The persistent gender wage gap across regions may reflect a number of factors, including women's continued disadvantage in terms of education and skills; their lack of an organized voice and bargaining power; gender-specific constraints on their labour market mobility; and their relatively high involvement in part-time or temporary jobs." Many characteristics of the labor market constrain the employment opportunities of women and make it easier for them to be responsible for care work.

=== Societal pressures ===
There are various societal pressures that combine to create the double burden, including some economic thinking of domestic work, thoughts about net household gain, and the perceived notion that women are more likely to ask for maternity leave than men. Many classical economists believe that child care does not contribute to economic growth of the nation. They believe that welfare states such as Sweden are subsidizing work that is unproductive, and often think of children like a pet that only consumes without growing up to be productive workers. There is also the notion that the net household gain of a woman taking an hour away from her unpaid labor in order to do paid labor is always more than the net household gain of a man taking an hour away from paid labor to do unpaid labor. This creates the thought that women should do paid work and lose some time doing domestic jobs without the man taking time away from paid work to do domestic jobs, creating a deficit of hours necessary to do unpaid work that need to get filled. In addition, women are seen as more likely to ask for maternity leave than men, meaning that it is more difficult for them to obtain a well paying job, which has negative effects on female employment.

=== Political pressure ===
One of the political pressures, it is suggested by Susan Himmelweit is the issue of whom to empower. When there are considerations of policies, politicians usually only consider work as paid labor, and do not take into account the interdependence between unpaid work and paid work. It is also often common to think that women make economic decisions similarly to men. This is typically not the case, because for men, payment is simply a compensation for lost leisure time. However, for women, when they are working in the paid sector, they are still losing money because they have to make provisions for the domestic labor they are unable to do, such as caring for children or making dinner from scratch due to lack of resources such as child care. Her net financial gain is less than the financial gain of a man because she has to spend her earnings on providing for these provisions. In addition, increasing paid work hours in order to have more money may have negative effects on the woman due to the increased total work hours and decreased leisure time. Therefore, policies that give greater power to people who do paid labor, such as cutting back on public expenditure in order to lessen income taxes have an adverse effect on female employment and the effect that the double burden has on females. Such policies give greater power and consideration towards people who work in the paid sector, and less towards people who work in the unpaid sector.

Another political issue surrounding the double burden is what sort of policies directly or indirectly affect those who do domestic work. Some policies that companies have, such as a lower rate for part-time workers or firing workers when they get pregnant can be seen as disempowering women. Debate as to whether this is gender segregation continues. On one side, only women get pregnant and there is a disproportionate number of women who do part-time work instead of full-time, suggesting that there should be allowances made for women. However, there is also the argument that similar to men who fail to meet the standards of the company and cannot comply with their contract, women who cannot perform work at the performance expected of them should be given the proportionate number of benefits and given no exceptions over men.

=== Separate notion of paid work vs. unpaid work ===
As the term double burden might suggest, when people consider paid work vs. unpaid work, they often consider them as two separate entities - that the man or woman is doing one or the other, but not at the same time. In reality, men and especially women often undertake both paid and unpaid labor simultaneously, creating the issue of work intensity, where the person undertakes many activities at the same time in order to compensate for the time necessary to accomplish many things in one day. Household surveys often only let people write down one thing that they are doing at any given time, and do not take into consideration that they may be cooking while cleaning, or sewing while taking care of the children. Because of this, the time taken for child care and other domestic activities may be underestimated. This coping mechanism of undertaking two or more tasks at once can especially be seen in women in developing countries. For example, many Caribbean rural women use this as a method of increasing the number of things they can accomplish in a day.

=== Increased nuclearization of family ===
Due to the increasing trend of decreased fertility rate, there has been an increased nuclearization of the family, where families have less immediate relatives to depend on in times of need. Because of this phenomenon, families do not have an extended family to depend on when they need a caretaker or someone to do domestic work, and must turn to market substitutes or a member of the immediate family doing both domestic and paid work instead.

== Gender differences ==
=== Women ===
Many studies have been done to investigate the division of household labor within couples, and more specifically, on the gender roles played by a variety of people worldwide. According to The State of the World's Children 2007, women generally work longer hours than men regardless if they live in a developed or developing country. Most studies found that when both parents are faced with a full-time job, women are faced with a higher amount of a domestic workload than men. According to the World Bank Latin American and Caribbean Studies, Mexican women in the labor force still spend approximately 33 hours each week performing household responsibilities. In contrast, husbands only contribute approximately 6 hours each week. Even more striking, "daughters contribute 14 hours weekly helping their mothers, while sons spend the same time as their fathers (that is, 5–6 hours weekly)." In a study done by Statistics Canada's General Social Survey of 10,000 households, the average man spent under two hours a day dealing with childcare and house work while women on average spent a little more than three. This study highlights the unequal distribution of labor between partners. Of the people surveyed, under fifteen percent of the couples agreed on doing around the same amount of work in the house. About 83 percent of women participated in housecleaning and food preparation compared to only 51 percent of men who were surveyed.

John Frederick Conway's book, The Canadian Family in Crisis, explores effects of the double burden by gender. In Conway's studies, he discovers the physical, emotional, and psychological differences between men and women faced with the double burden in Canada. In these studies it was found that women who are raising children and are in the workforce are more prone to have anxiety and many other stress related effects than the women who are just faced with one of the two burdens.

=== Men ===
Even though the effects of raising children and having a career simultaneously are mostly seen in women throughout many societies, the men in such situations are affected greatly as well. This is not seen in all situations in males because the effects on men differ greatly from how females are affected by this extra responsibility. In The Canadian Family in Crisis, the author suggests a reason for these effects to go unnoticed in most studies and surveys. This is because women's stress can be seen through direct labor consisting of housework and career whereas men's stress, in most cases, mostly comes from decision making and work-family conflicts. These situations arise where the male must make the best choice for the future of his family. Specifically, these include things such as workload, overtime hours, shift decisions, and even accepting a promotion or a transfer. In these situations, the man is forced to make major choices that will affect the entire family, which brings on more stress. The effects also go unnoticed since, in traditional gender roles, the male is supposed to be the backbone of the family and, in the past, it would have been seen as weakness for the male to display his emotions to the rest of the family. In surveys and studies done, most males would not like to be seen as too weak to handle his responsibilities as the role of the adult male in the household, which in the past has consisted of being the major economic supporter and physical figure for the family. With this in mind, it is very possible that some may have lied when surveyed about these topics.

== Types ==
=== Work vs. family ===
Parenting is a large task within itself, and when a parent has a career as well, it can cause a double burden, or work–family conflict. Strain begins to develop when women and men find that the demands of their family are conflicting with the demands from their job. When one is faced with a double burden like this, it affects how decisions are made within a career and in a family; this burden could potentially effect when a couple decides to have children. 75% of all women who have jobs are in their childbearing prime. When the conflict between one's family and work presents itself, the unpaid work that is being done in the home may be cut down, because of the certain health effects, or as a solution to deal with the greater demands from the workplace. Social outings and visits, and family dinners are two of the first things that get cut back on due to the work/family conflict. In a study by Ari Väänänen, May V. Kevin, et al. found that if a man put a higher importance on their family, were more likely to stay home from work in order to deal with extreme family demands. Ways that the double burden can be lessened for is with hired help in the house, day-care facilities, and longer maternity leaves for women. For instance, in Norway women are allowed the options of 10 months of maternity leave, where they will get 100% of their pay, or 12 months leave, where they will only paid 80% of their earnings. Some companies are realizing the effect the double burden of work and a family is having on their employees and are offering flexible work schedules in order to help their employees cope. Not only do these flexible hours help the employee deal with their stress, but it also benefits the company because workers are happier, less likely to be absent, more productive, and the turnover rate is lower for the company. As Sophia Mwangi says, "Parenthood is a joy. Let us never be burdened by it but let's celebrate the joy that it brings. Celebrate those first steps or words, the first school play, their graduation day, passing those exams, landing their first job, getting married, making you grandparents. Whatever it is, let's celebrate our children. It's not easy, but the art of juggling can always be mastered!"

=== Family vs. school ===
Raising a family is not an easy task, and deciding to go back to school while raising a family can be a monumentual decision for the family says Carol Jacobs of the Jewish Employ-ment & Vocational Service. Her advice to those considering going back to school is, "Talk to an educational consultant and people in the field you want to be in." She adds, "This is a commitment and the decision should involve your family. Will you be available to go to your child's softball game or have time to cook dinner?" There are many reasons why someone may put off to school until their children are older, such as not wanting to leave them in the hand of a baby sitter constantly at such a young age. However, once the children get older the parent pursuing an education, may start missing school events that they would have normally attended. The guilt of having to leave a child while attending to educational matters is less when the child is old enough to be able to ask questions about where their parent is and comprehend the response. Even though pursuing an education while nurturing a family will have its cost, the benefits include getting a higher paying job, gaining more knowledge, and becoming more stable financially. Most of the time this burden will include the person trying to balance a job along with their family and schooling, because they still need to work in order to provide for their family at the present moment. For people who have a hard time fitting classes into their schedule around the needs of their family, there are options where they will be required to do all of the work for a course, but it will all take place online. For example, the University of Delaware and the University of Phoenix Online have both Bachelor of Science in Nursing and Master of Science in Nursing programs for people to complete online.

=== Single vs. married parents ===
==== Single parent double burdens ====
"Single Parents do not typically have the luxury of dividing tasks between two adults in the home." "The Parents in a married-couple family may be able to divide their tasks so that one parent specializes more in work-related and income-producing activities and the other parent specializes more in home-related, non-income producing activities." Married parents have that option to split the workload, even though it usually does not happen, but single parents do not have the option of sharing the workload with anyone.

The double burden is usually viewed as a primary problem for single women or married women. However, it is often less recognized that men can and often do go through the same trials and hard times as a parent trying to balance work and the family. Within the book The Canadian Family in Crisis, Conway addresses this issue with an argument from Eichler. Eichler says, "Social science fails to understand men" by tending "to downplay or ignore a potential conflict between work and home for men." Married men can avoid the full impact of the double burden, but single fathers are totally incapable of avoiding the double burden of family and work. Though single fathers face the same number of problems that single mothers face, they have two advantages that play in their favor. Men usually have a higher income and have a shorter time of being single than women. However, until they are remarried or have a woman to help them out around the house, men still must deal with the sexual and emotional frustration as a woman does. They must deal with the balancing of work, childcare, and domestic responsibilities. Single fathers are usually doubtful about their ability be a parent, and they are challenged psychologically. "The problems faced by the working single father are more than merely the logistical problems shared by all working parents. He has to change the way he feels about himself as man." A man being a single parent and feelings the effects of the double burden can and will interfere with his career just as it does with a single mother that has a career. A study showed that five percent of single fathers were fired from their jobs due to the double burden and another eight percent quit because the double burden became too much of a burden for them to balance both work and the family. With that being said, single fathers feel the same, if not more, of the effect of the double burden as women do.

The double burden that single mothers endure has a historical precedent, and still exists currently. Single mothers usually have higher rates of employment and children at home, and have the highest levels overall of the double burden. Women also typically have less economic resources than men, and have no partner to share the workload with them. Single mothers fall heavily under economic vulnerability. They may face job discrimination and not earn as much, so there will be further difficulties in maintaining the double burden. Single-mother families tend to hover near the poverty line, with a poverty rate that is twice as high of that for men.

==== Married parent double burdens ====
The double burden also presents itself in households with married parents. Households with two parents may only have one working parent providing the majority of domestic activities.

Because of women's expanded roles in the workforce have generally not been accompanied by any relaxation of expectations for their family and domestic activities, many women today face the double burden of home and work responsibilities. Many women take on the largest portion of the domestic obligations of the home, even when they are working full-time jobs. This breeds anger and frustration, as these women know they do the majority of the housework on top of their careers. There have been said to be more reasons, other than gender roles, as to why there is a difference in the housework performed by men and women. Some theories have suggested that women's expectations for household cleanliness are higher than men's. Women feel like they must be responsible for the condition of the home in a way that men do not. Men do invest most of their time in their careers, but women spend double that time caring for the children, state of the home, and taking care of the domestic responsibilities. In a graph from the U.S. Bureau of Labor Statistics in 2004, that compare the workload of married men and women between the ages of 25 and 54, women are displayed as performing one hundred percent more housework than men, and men are displayed as having more leisure time than women. As the double burden increased in 1980, women became more critical of their marriages than men and wanted the men to do more around the house to ease the burden of a "second shift". The double burden of women who have jobs and still shoulder the majority of the housework at home leads to women filing or initiating divorce.

This concept of the double burden with married couples is a worldwide phenomenon. Throughout different cultures of the world, women spend more total hours in work than men do. In Japan, once married, they are still expected to be devoted wives and mothers who give all of their effort to the home, even after a full day of work. Latin American women, now entering the workforce in large numbers, still face what they call doble jornada, or double day's journey. Although in the Latin American culture, men are starting to interact more with the children and helping around the house more, the main domestic responsibilities still fall upon the women of the house. Sometimes women who are primary wage earners are still relegated to most of the domestic work. European men are more likely to play and interact with their children but not likely to participate fully in their daily care. They are more likely to help their wives at home, yet rarely do they tackle all domestic task equally. Men commonly fail to live up to their belief of equal sharing of domestic labor: they may believe in an equal workload in the house, but the inconvenience of taking on work done by their wives stops many from following through.

Also, domestic labor ("housework") has been traditionally defined as "welfare" related activities, such as cooking and cleaning. However, married men generally contribute more to household and material maintenance, construction, and repair activities that are not usually captured under domestic obligations.

=== Middle-class vs. poor families ===
==== Middle-class families ====
Middle-class families often use substitutes for domestic work to make up for the lost time while working in the paid sector. They buy time taking care of children by using hired help and day-care centers. They also decrease the burden of paid work and unpaid work by using household appliances such as microwaves, laundry machines, and dishwashers, as well as buying pre-made food, eating out and using laundry services.

==== Poor families ====
Poor families are much more constrained in their economic ability to "buy back" lost time through the market. Instead of buying market substitutes, they try to meet their needs without spending money by taking care of children instead of hiring help, taking care of the sick instead of taking them to the hospital, and making food from scratch instead of buying pre-made food. The way that poor families deal with the time debt is for the main caretaker to intensify the time that they spend working, by doing multiple jobs at once instead of doing one job at a time. When people increase the intensity of their work to compensate for their lack of time to finish everything that needs to get done, called work intensity, many health problems occur.

== Effects ==
=== Health effects ===
==== Stress ====
When faced with the double burden of having to deal with the responsibilities of both a career as well as domestic duties, sometimes a person's health is affected. Many people faced with these circumstances have a higher chance of being sick since health and stress seem to be correlated, as stress has been implicated in up to eighty percent of all illnesses, as found by a report done by the Canadian Advisory Council on the Status of Women. In an article that was written by a team of researchers it was found that both men and women faced with a "spillover" of work and family issues were 1.5-1.6 times more likely to have an absence due to sickness than others. Men and women in these situations have also been proven to be more likely to be faced with psychological stress and even see themselves as unhealthier than their colleagues who are not in their situation.

Although women faced with double burden usually have more stress than most women in today's society, it was proven that in most cases they are psychologically healthier than women who are not faced with these circumstances, for either being a stay at home mother or for being a working woman without children to take care of.

==== Mortality rate ====
In a study done by Rosamund Weatherall, Heather Joshi and Susan Macran of the London School of Hygiene and Tropical Medicine in 1994, the research presented suggests that women presented with the double burden have a lower mortality rate than women who are simply housewives. The women who were observed that had part-time jobs had a mortality rate lower than the women with full-time jobs and children. The same study also suggests that women who have young children are less likely to die than women who have no children or have older children. Although this evidence can not be strictly attributed to the double burden of having children and a career field, it can give a good indication of a trend in society. Also, this study was conducted in multiple countries including England, Wales, and the United States which gives the information presented from the study a more global perspective on the double burden.

==== Absences due to sickness ====
In several Western countries, it has been seen that absences due to sickness for women are far greater than men. When investigating the reasons behind this, a study done in Sweden published in 1996 found that half of the difference between genders can be dismissed if you take out the days missed by pregnant women. When taking into account the health effects of double burden, child birth is always a possibility for mothers who already are faced with taking care of children and having a career and effects them and their health. In many studies, people have tried to relate the difference in sickness absences directly to the double burden effect. It has been somewhat successful as women who are faced with work and child care have been known to request more sick days than men in the same situation. Additionally, working wives with children have twice the absence rate as men who are placed in the same position in work family conflicts.

==== Loss of sleep ====
The stress of maintaining a career and a household can also lead to a loss of sleep. In traditional gender roles it is usually the mother who is the one to get the family going in the morning as she fixes breakfast and takes the children to school before she goes to her own job. At night the mother cooks and does various other activities around the house that cause her to be the last person to retire for the night as well. Although this is merely just a few gender roles that are not set in stone, they may hold to be true. It was found that working women sleep twenty-five minutes less a night due solely to their responsibility for domestic work. Applying this statistic in larger scale leads to the assumption that women on average lose up to thirteen hours of sleep per month due to domestic duties. It can be assumed that it is possible for an average woman to lose up to one hundred and fifty-six hours of sleep during a year because of domestic work and motherly duties.

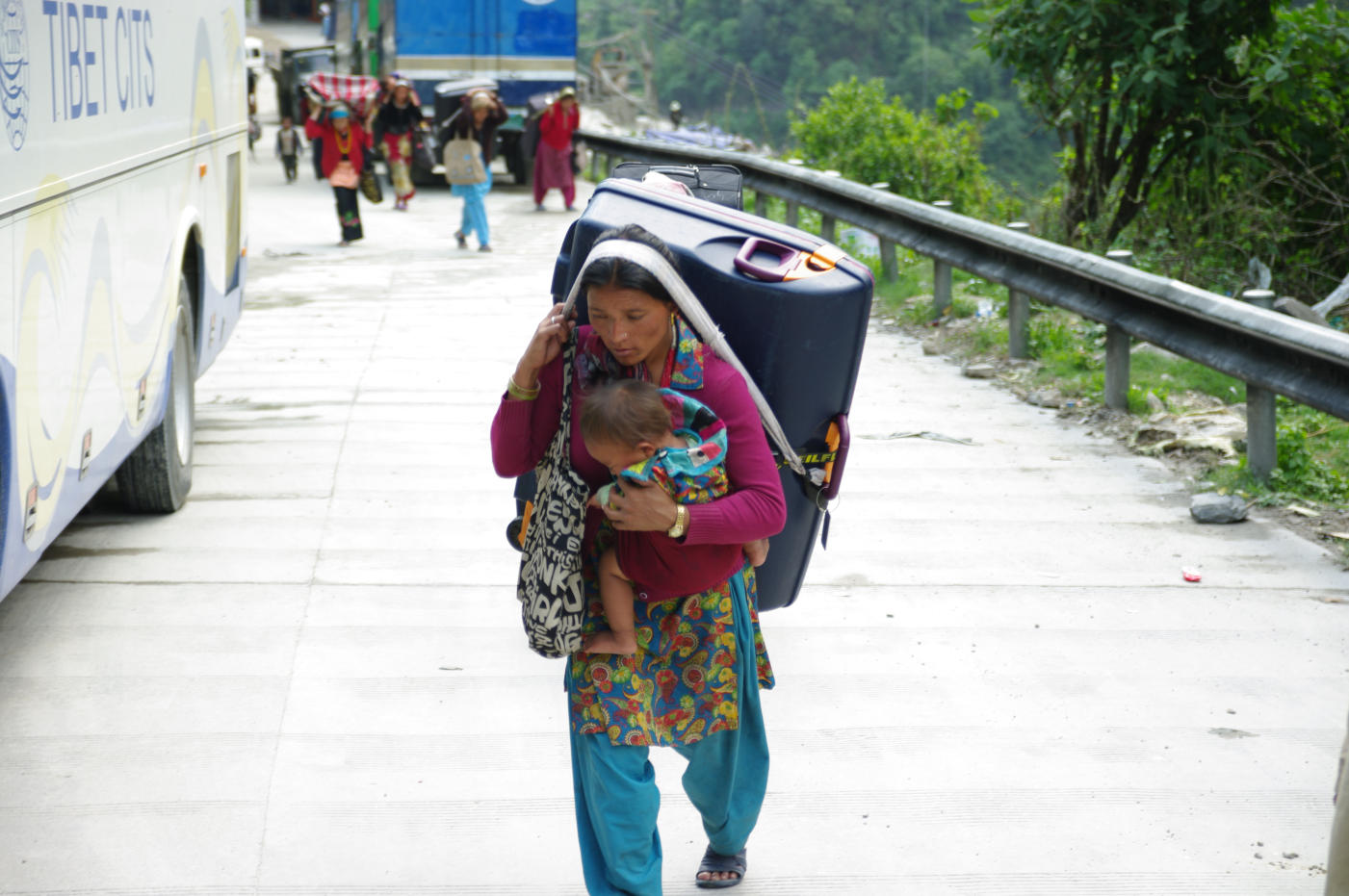
Woman working while taking care of her child

==== Work intensity ====
For many poor women and men whose work hours have reached the point where they cannot cut back on leisure time anymore to make time for domestic and paid work, work intensity is an issue because they often intensify their work time by doing two or more activities at once, such as taking care of children while cooking. Work intensity can lead to many negative health consequences, such as lack of sleep, stress, and lack of recreation.

=== Economic effects ===
There are many economic effects to the person who has to shoulder the double burden. Oftentimes, this tends to be the woman in the relationship, and so there has been analysis done on the economic effect of the double burden on women. According to Himmelweit (2002), because women often earn less than men, there is the thought that the woman should be the one to fit her paid job around household activities such as taking care of children. Because of this, and because they have many domestic duties, women often take part-time jobs and jobs in the informal sector in order to balance paid work with domestic work. Part-time jobs and jobs in the informal sector do earn less than full-time jobs, so men have to increase their paid work hours in order to compensate for the lacking family income. This will "weaken her earning power and strengthen his", leading to an unequal distribution of power in the household, and allow the man to exploit the woman's unpaid work. This situation could have negative consequences especially for the woman because she is perceived to have less contribution to the household, due to domestic work being seen as less of a contribution than paid work. Such negative consequences include the lack of a divorce threat, where the woman does not have the economic means to ask for a divorce because she does not have a full-time job, and she has less money that she personally receives, decreasing her perceived contributions to the household.

== Solutions ==
=== Cultural evolution ===
As discussed in the previous section on Causes, the double burden is a product of patriarchal power structures and capitalist models of labor and value which still persist. It has been suggested that deconstructing patriarchal and capitalist power structures could address the double burden.

=== Family-friendly initiatives ===
Family-friendly initiatives are a possible solution to redistributing the load of unpaid work and alleviating the double burden. Possible initiatives include flexible work hours; part-time and job-sharing options; parental leave; child care subsidies; and on-site daycare options. There are two primary approaches to assisting working families: "One stresses the importance of action from within, with emphasis on private, internal, local initiatives within firms and organizations to alter workplace norms, conventions, and practices. The other approach calls for government interventions designed to facilitate proper care for children with less sacrifice of parents' job opportunities, advancement, and compensation".

=== Government initiatives ===
The Nordic countries exemplify the use of family-friendly initiatives. For example, a nine-month parental leave is divided into thirds in Iceland. Three months are for the mother. Three non-transferable months are for the father, and there are three months that both parents can share. "The reimbursement is 80 per cent of the salary. From 2001 to October 2003, the average number of days taken by men increased from 39 to 83, and 13 per cent of Icelandic fathers used more than their non-transferable part." Dual-income families are becoming the norm, especially in industrialized countries, so it is not uncommon for large corporations to practice some form of family-friendly initiative.

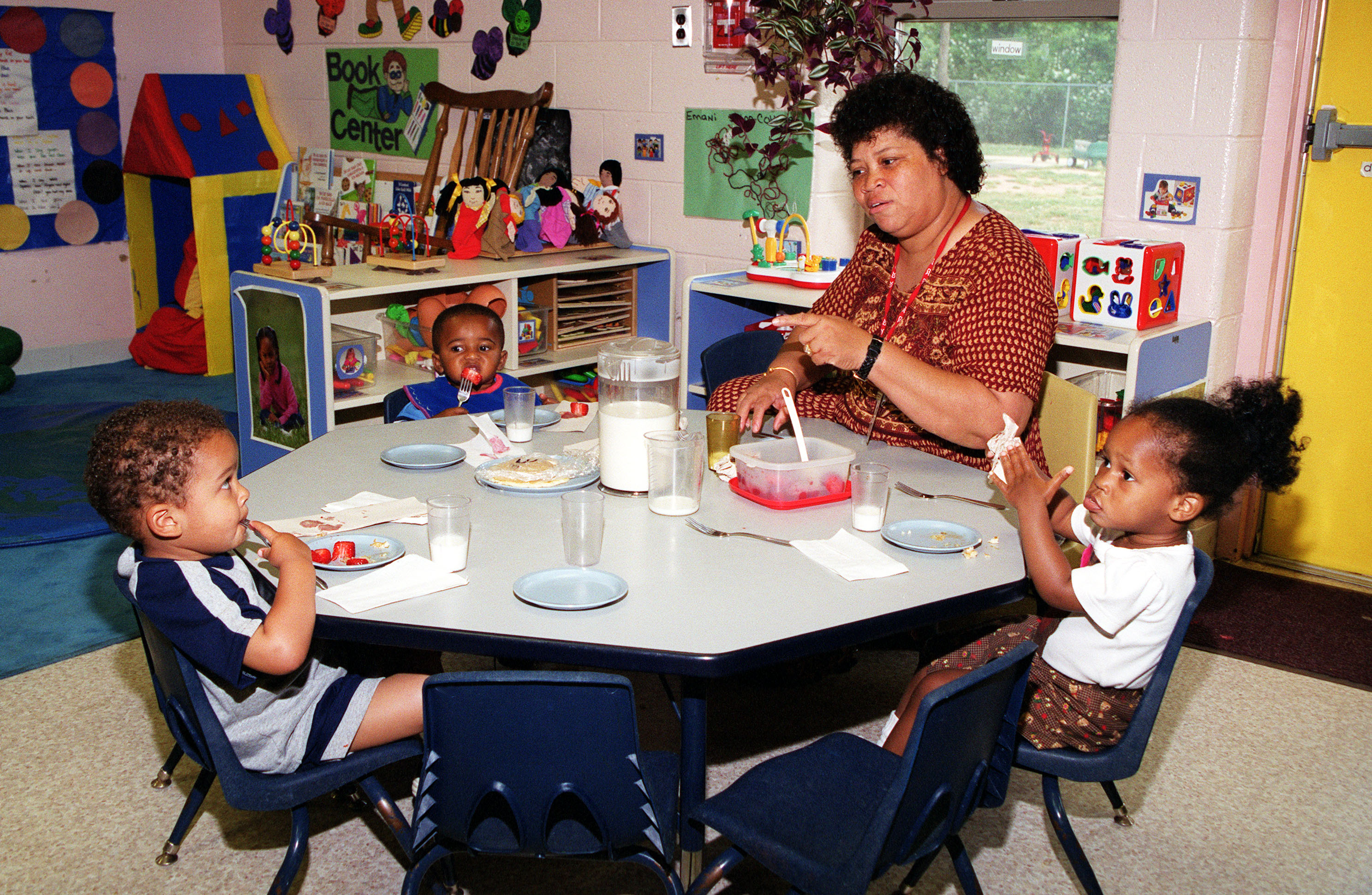
Child care facility

Government family-friendly initiatives such as child subsidies and cheaper child care facilities can also greatly decrease the gender difference in the workplace, due to the woman being able to work longer hours outside the home. In addition, when developing policies related to paid work, it is important to do gender impact assessments in order to assess the impact of a policy on both the paid and unpaid sector.

=== Workplace initiatives ===
Whenever there is talk about new policies regarding new work time policies, there is often the argument for longer work hours in exchange for a shorter work week. For example, many are in favor of longer work hours such as "three ten-hour days or four eight-hour days". However, this is often not the best work hours for people who take care of children, because children go to school for perhaps six hours a day, not eight or ten. Caretakers would prefer the opposite - shorter hours and longer weeks, such as six hour work days for six times a week, with limits on evening work and overtime, as well as flexible schedules. In order to lessen the burden of taking care of children and domestic duties as well as working in the paid sector, workplaces should consider policies that take into account the preferred work hours of caretakers. In addition, it is often the case now that many workers juggle domestic work and paid work. In order to get the most effective workers, companies should consider changing their policies in order to attract the best people in the field.

== Criticism of double burden thesis ==
Catherine Hakim's paper rejects statistics of the European Foundation for the Improvement of Living and Working Conditions as "the main source of tendentious polemics on women's unfair burden and gender inequality". Her paper states that the idea of a double burden is a myth and concludes instead that "on average, women and men across Europe do the same total number of productive work hours, once paid jobs and unpaid household work are added together – roughly eight hours a day."

In the book Time for Life: The Surprising Ways Americans Use Their Time, authors John Robinson and Geoffrey Godbey argue that the view that women are working a second shift is contested, and time-use analysis shows that time spent by men and women in total paid and unpaid work, and its inverse, leisure time, is broadly equal in the USA.

Results from the 2021/22 Time Use Survey conducted by Statistics Austria show that the total daily working time for women averages 7 hours and 38 minutes, and for men, the average total daily working time is 7 hours and 25 minutes, representing a 13-minute difference between the genders.

According to a 2012 Pew Research Center survey and an analysis of the American Time Use Survey, working-age American men spend 0.4 hours more per week doing paid and unpaid work than women (45.6 hours per week for men and 45.2 hours for women). Among married couples with children, this difference rises to 1.4 hours per week (55.5 hours per week for men and 54.1 hours per week for women).

== See also ==
- Occupational health psychology
- Partner effects
- Reproductive labor
- Work–family balance in the United States
