= Mary Margaret Conway =

American political scientist

- Scientific career
- Fields: Political science
- Institutions: University of Florida

Mary Margaret Conway, often published as M. Margaret Conway or Margaret Conway, is an American political scientist. She is a Distinguished Professor Emerita at the University of Florida. Conway is a scholar of political behavior, and particularly on how gender and race affect political participation.

== Career ==
Conway has published extensively on the topic of political behavior and its interactions with gender and race.

In 1985, Conway published the book Political Participation in the United States. Conway structured the book around paradoxes in the study of participation in the United States, which allowed her to both challenge and elaborate the major theories of political participation. Political Participation in the United States was reprinted several times, and by its third edition in 2000 it had become a central book in the study of political participation.

Conway's study of the general problem of political participation in America has included several works that examine the participation of different demographic groups in American politics. She was a co-author, with Pei-te Lien and Janelle Wong, of the 2004 book The Politics of Asian Americans. In The Politics of Asian Americans, Lien, Conway, and Wong use a national survey to study Asian Americans' progress and the social barriers that remain, and to measure the extent of their political participation and social integration.

Conway has also published books and articles on political participation by women, including as a co-author of the 2004 book Women & Public Policy: A Revolution in Progress. She was also a coauthor, with David W. Ahern and Gertrude A. Steuernagel, of the 1997 book Women and Political Participation: Cultural Change in the Political Arena, which had multiple printings. Conway has also studied the question of why so few women held public office in the United States through the end of the 20th century.

Conway received the 2004 Frank J. Goodnow Award from The American Political Science Association, which is awarded to recognize "outstanding service to the political science community and to the Association".

== Selected works ==
- Political Participation in the United States (1985)
- Women and political participation: Cultural change in the political arena (1997)
- The Politics of Asian Americans, with Pei-te Lien and Janelle Wong (2004)
