= Work–family balance in the United States =

Average annual hours actually worked per worker in OECD countries from 1970 to 2020

Work–family balance in the United States differs significantly for families of different social class. This differs from work–life balance: while work–life balance may refer to the health and living issues that arise from work, work–family balance refers specifically to how work and families intersect and influence each other.

Middle-class family issues center on dual-earner spouses and parents while lower class issues center on problems that arise due to single parenting. Work–family balance issues also differ by class, since middle class occupations provide more benefits and family support while low-wage jobs are less flexible with benefits. Solutions for helping individuals manage work–family balance in the U.S. include legislation, workplace policies, and the marketization of care work.

== History ==
Family structure (how the family is organized) historically has been influenced by social-level forces, many of them economic. According to family historian Stephanie Coontz, marriage and family formation in the 17th century was heavily influenced by desires to form economic and political alliances. Children were seen as a method of ensuring the passage of political and economic power to future generations.

Influenced by the Enlightenment, several changes to marriage occurred: the move toward individualism and the loosening of church influence over families after the Protestant Reformation resulted in the flourishing of the two-parent farm family. Prior to the Industrial Revolution, the two-parent farm family was the dominant family model, in which both parents working side by side on family farms The two-parent farm family ceased to be the dominant family model after the Industrial Revolution occurred. The 1920s was the first time that the majority of children lived in two-parent breadwinner-homemaker families (one where the father supported the family financially and the mother supported the family domestically).

In 19th century farm settings, children were an important part of their families' agricultural livelihoods. As industrialization occurred and families shifted from rural agricultural settings to urban ones, the number of children per household also declined. Children became less of an economic benefit and more of a cost: urban life necessitated educating children which was costly.

During the 1910s and 1920s, women delayed childbirth for economic opportunities that were present in urban areas. However, this trend reversed during the Great Depression because of the lower number of economic opportunities available for women. As a result, Depression Era women were more likely to marry and have children earlier. In 1900, roughly 40 percent of single women were employed versus only five percent of married women (Preston, 2003). This 35 percent gap persisted for many years. Goldin (1992), in a study of women college graduates in the twentieth century, concluded that those graduating between 1900 and 1920 had to make "a distinct choice between family and career".

The Works Progress Administration opened about 3,000 part-day Emergency Nursery Schools for about 75,000 children from 1933 to 1935, which provided child care to help eligible adults looking for work and which employed teachers in an industry where two-thirds of private nursery schools had closed during the Depression. Men were drafted into the military in large numbers during World War II, and women with young children were needed to supplement single women and those with older children at wartime factories. Problems with women leaving children in unsafe situations while working began to appear. ENS capacity peaked at 130,000 children in 1944. Wartime New Deal measures such as the Lanham Act and Servicemen's Dependents Allowance Act of 1942 provided federal funding for day care centers starting in 1942.

The breadwinner–homemaker model regained dominance during the twenty-year period immediately after World War II. The economy relied upon the male breadwinner to earn the income to support his family financially, while women were relied upon to do the care work and other forms of domestic work to support her husband's earnings.

As the economy went into recession during the 1970s, women entered the workforce in large droves. Families could no longer survive on the single income of the male breadwinner and both sexes were relied upon for financial support. The dominant family model starting in the 1970s was the dual-earner family where both parents worked. Women also entered college in higher percentages. However, the economy was still assumed to run on an outdated breadwinner-homemaker model as evidence by the following things: women made significantly less income than men, they were still expected to do the majority of domestic work, and the nine-to-three o'clock school schedule of children still existed. The recession of the 1970s also further pushed the correlation between income and family structure. As more and more previously lucrative manufacturing jobs were sent overseas, men without college educations could no longer support their families on a single wage. Women's labor force participation rates have steadily increased since the 1940s Since the 1970s, the relationship between marriage and college education has also been positive.

Congress passed the Comprehensive Child Development Act in 1971, which subsidized child care to make it universal, but the bill was vetoed by President Richard Nixon.

=== Legislation ===
Historically significant pieces of legislation have been enacted at the federal level to address the sex disparities in the workplace. These pieces of legislation attempt to address the wage gap in the U.S., gender discrimination in hiring and firing, and the occupational rights of workers in taking family and medical leave. Despite these significant legislative efforts, the U.S. still lags behind other developed countries in progressive family-friendly work policies.

==== Mother's Pensions of 1910 ====
From 1890 to 1910, the proportion of working women increased by 8%, from 1.2 million to 3.1 million workers, which influenced the creation of Mother's Pensions in 1910, which gave non-working mothers pensions to offset their need to work outside the home. According to scholar Sonya Michel, this legislation did little to decrease the wage gap between men and women because women “preferred to work, did not fit the criteria,” or the states ran out of funds.

==== Equal Pay Act of 1963 ====
The Equal Pay Act of 1963 attempted to abolish wage and payment discrimination between men and women.

==== Title VII of the Civil Rights Act of 1964 ====
Title VII mandates against gender discrimination in the workplace. It makes gender discrimination on the basis of pregnancy and childbirth illegal. The Pregnancy Discrimination Act of 1978 is an amendment to Title VII that explicitly prohibits discrimination against pregnant women.

==== Head Start of 1965 ====
The only federal childcare ever implemented was Head Start, which was created in 1965 as a part of President Lyndon B. Johnson’s War on Poverty. Head Start is a program for low-income families that provides early education and care for 3- to 5-year-olds. Head Start is free for eligible families (those living below the federal poverty line), but families apply and there is no guarantee for a spot. In 2017, there were 1 million children enrolled in Head Start and Early Head Start, but there are about 19 million children under five in the United States and around 3 million children under five living in poverty.

==== Family Support Act of 1988 ====
In 1988, the Family Support Act was passed, which required parents using federal programs, like Head Start, to actively be working, getting an education, or taking part in professional training. At the time, 56% of mothers with children under 6 were already in the workforce, which meant that mothers who were unable to comply with guidelines were denied the assistance they were previously eligible for.

==== Child Care and Development Block Grant and Title IV-A At-Risk Child Care ====
Child Care and Development Block Grant and Title IV-A At-Risk Child Care were passed due to a demand for childcare support among middle- and upper-middle-class families, as Head Start was restricted to families that were below the Federal Poverty Line, and the recognition that families who were at risk of losing work would soon enter the welfare system but could use help before they qualified for traditional assistance.

==== Family and Medical Leave Act of 1993 ====
The Family and Medical Leave Act of 1993 requires employers to provide job-protected unpaid leave for certain family and medical reasons. Legitimate reasons include pregnancy, childbirth, adoption, foster care placement, and care for an ill family member. However, this legislation is limited: coverage is only extended for twelve weeks and for employees who have worked for at least twelve months at the same job. Short-term medical illness and routine medical checkups were not covered until the FMLA, and family members other than parents, spouses, and children are not covered. Some states have extended the definition of family on their own, and therefore extended the coverage of FMLA.

==== Child Care Development Fund of 1996 ====
In 1996, the Child Care Development Fund was created to allow states flexibility in creating childcare provisioning for low- and lower-middle-income families. Despite this change, families still face significant barriers when trying to access these subsidies, with less than ¼ of eligible families using them.

==== Child and Dependent Care Tax Credit of 1998 ====
The Child and Dependent Care Tax Credit offsets childcare expenses. The tax credit covers 20 to 35% of costs and is capped at $3,000 for one child and $6,000 for two or more children. It offsets income taxes, so families in lower-income brackets receive little money in return. In 2016, only 15% of families received this subsidy.

== Effects on families ==
The structural economic changes have influenced specific aspects of the family. However, not all families are affected in the same way. In the U.S., whether or not a family is dual or single-earner is related to their social class and income. The economic changes in the past couple of decades have affected middle-class and lower-class families very differently in many aspects, especially since the 1970s economic recession. These family inequalities significantly affect the intersection of race and social class in the United States as well.

=== Problems affecting middle-class families ===
Middle-class families have certain class-specific problems that arise when family and work intersects. Many of them have to do with the balance parents must create between their career aspirations and their familial desires. Because the middle class has greater access to more stable occupations and the chances for occupational mobility, many middle class American families must deal with the ultimate decision between balancing their families with their jobs. Although the figures vary depending on parents' household income, the U.S. Department of Agriculture estimates families spend anywhere from $134,370 to $269,520 raising a child from birth through age 17.

==== Delayed fertility ====
Middle-class women oftentimes delay motherhood until after the peak of their fertility at age 29–30, a delay that has become more common in the last two decades. Motherhood is delayed because of the higher educational and career aspirations middle-class women oftentimes make—the career incentives are too great to pass up. While middle-class women on average have children at age 29, lower-class women typically have children much earlier in their lives because of the lack of incentives to delay childbirth. According to Edin and Kefalas, lower-class women do not make the same delay because they are oftentimes lacking the career and educational incentives that middle-class women have.

The delay in fertility becomes a problem among middle-class women when they delay childbirth past their fertility peak. Since fertility peaks at a certain age, pushing childbirth past that age significantly decreases the probability that certain women will be able to have children. The media has been an influence on women's fertility choices: popular celebrities who have managed to have children well into their forties and other medical miracles covered in the media oftentimes give women false hope that they themselves will also be able to bear children later in life. For every success story, however, there are many more disappointments.

==== Ideology of motherhood ====
Although American women have made significant strides in the workplace, they are still culturally and socially required to be mothers first and foremost. The cultural ideas of motherhood in the U.S. have given birth to a new ideal: a working mother who not only has a wonderful career but also manages to flawlessly balance her family and domestic duties as well. This ideal is known as the "supermom." The media is a culprit in this depiction: A study examining the portrayal of mothers in magazines showed that the most popular magazines in the U.S. still continue to promote the traditional role of motherhood while undermining homemakers by portraying them as superficial and negative. Instead, only the Supermom type is portrayed and rarely critiqued.

As a result of this Supermom ideal, cultural contradictions of motherhood widely exist. Working mothers are often critiqued for being selfish and not spending enough time with their children. They defend their position by saying they work to support their children economically. Homemakers are often critiqued for not pursuing meaningful careers. They respond by saying that the childcare and other domestic work they do for their families is much more important. Only the unrealistic depiction of the supermom can balance these two ideological extremes, but that ideal is an unrealistic solution for most women.

The idea that parents only should raise their children is not a long-standing social expectation, but one that is reserved to the United States and its conservative nuclear family values. Before modern medicine, high mortality rates meant it was common for children to be raised by others outside their immediate family. This idea did not make its way to the New World because the Puritans put high value on families raising their children and preparing them for the world, and if the parents could not fulfill this role, the children were taken away. For a brief period in the early 1800s, infant schools challenged this notion, but by the mid-1800s, counter-movements de-popularized this belief and reinforced that mothers specifically were supposed to raise their children. During World War II, the United States saw for the first time a nationwide, federally funded nursery school program, but after the war, the program was automatically disbanded since women no longer had to work outside the home. Despite the disbanding of these programs, many women chose to stay in the workforce. To combat this belief, propaganda spread that mothers working poorly impacted their children’s mental well-being. The propaganda worked, and in the summer of 1945, 1 out of 4 women working in factories quit, and the remaining women were pushed into lower-paying, traditionally female-oriented jobs. It was not until the 1960s and 1970s, when more mothers started to enter the workforce, that the idea of childcare switched from something meant for children with problems at home to something that was a nationwide necessity.

==== Inequalities in care work ====
Despite the career gains women have made, their husbands have not reached parity in terms of their domestic work and care work. Women in the developed world, including the U.S., still do hours more of housework than their male counterparts, despite their success in the workplace. Working mothers on average do more work and sleep less than their husbands. The perception of who does more housework is also skewed by whether or not the husband or the wife is reporting. Unsurprisingly then, working mothers do not spend a significantly lower amount of time with their children compared to women who do not work—working mothers simply sleep less on average.

As a result, many middle-class families have resorted to alternative methods of child care. A common option is to buy child care, such as day care providers and centers.

=== Problems affecting lower-class families ===
Lower class families have been heavily influenced by income as well. Lower-class families have a different set of work–family balancing issues, many of which are much more difficult to solve than those of middle-class families.

==== Single-parenting ====
Single mothers are more likely to face challenges, with anywhere from 40.6% to 47.1% of single mothers being at or below 150% of the poverty line. According to Kathryn Edin, this is because of the lack of incentive to marry other lower-class men among lower-class women, and the desire to save marriage for more quality prospects. Unlike middle-class women, lower-class women do not have the same financial and marriage incentives to marry. As a result, lower class mothers have less incentive to delay their childbearing to later years. Many of the problems shared by single parents are disproportionately felt by the lower class for these very reasons.

The inability to use the income and time of two spouses has a harmful effect upon the work opportunities of lower-income mothers. Another factor is income: single-mothers tend to work lower income wage, which come with few benefits such as maternity leave, health insurance, childcare, and flexible schedules. Low-wage work oftentimes is characterized by weekly schedule changes, little flexibility, and extreme short notice for changes. As a result, lower class mothers have a greater a time crunch and more conflict in balancing their work needs with those of their children. Single mother home environments are much poorer because of nonstandard hours and schedules.

==== Care work ====
Single-mother and lower-class families have a much more difficult time negotiating childcare or finding sustainable childcare options. The breadwinner-homemaker family and economic model does not apply to single-parent families because the single-parent must be both roles at all times. Because child care services cost a substantial amount, low-income mothers spend a higher percentage of their income on child care than middle class mothers do. Few low-income mothers are happy with their childcare arrangements especially in light of the fact that low-income childcare arrangements suffer from frequent disruptions. In the United States, state assistance for childcare is nowhere near the level of other developed countries and has actually decreased.

== Solutions ==
The United States has lagged behind the social benefits that support working families when compared to other developed countries. Of the twenty-one richest countries in the world, only the United States does not mandate paid parental leave, and among the industrialized Western nations only the United States does not mandate paid vacations. Many solutions to the family-work balance problem have been observed in other countries and proposed in the U.S. Solutions specific to the U.S. have also developed recently. Recent U.S. policy has focused on "restoring marriage" rather than providing direct support to children.

Head Start was the first big push away from the charity-based mindset of childcare as seen through day nurseries, but even as childcare entered the political sphere, it has been considered as a program to address poverty only, which is one reason {as indicated in Burger} why we do not see universal child care in the United States. The 1970s and 1980s shifted the framing of childcare as an accessibility and affordability issue that also affected working parents, but still the programs passed were relegated to funding childcare, not creating childcare. Moving into the 1990s and 2000s, the framing became centered around working women’s need for childcare, but contrasting views that mothers should stay at home to take care of their young children halted provisioning from happening. There has been a shift in views on motherhood, with only a minority of Americans supporting the notion that mothers should stay home, but this is yet to be reflected in policy, with most still supporting the belief that middle-class women should take care of their children instead of pursuing a career {As indicated in Palley and Shdaimah’s research}. Current policies are motivated by the improvement of children’s development, facilitating employment among mothers, or alleviating poverty.

=== Care crisis ===
The care crisis in the United States refers to the lack of care work as the result of globalization. For the middle class, there has been an ongoing debate over who should take care of children: family members or child care providers However, the debate is slowly shifting to one concerning parents and child care providers to domestic workers. Globalization and the entrance of women into the workforce has prompted the mass immigration of transnational care chains - poor women who leave their home countries and go to developed countries to work specifically as domestic workers. This has become an option for many middle and upper-class families.

Poor families, however, still do not have the same care work markets that middle-class families do. Relying on formal child care providers is less disruptive and risky, but providers still pose a significant price problem.

=== Workplace ===
There are many workplace policies that can alleviate the burden of work–family balance for many middle-class families. Some options in family-friendly workplaces include providing paid leave or options for reduced hours. Workplaces are realizing that employees with well balanced family and work lives are actually valuable to firms: workplace childcare assistance can increase productivity and morale among employees, as well as lessen turnover, accidents, and absenteeism. Childcare options for working parents can be key in workplace satisfaction. Workplace supports such as personal time off, paid leave, on-site or nearby childcare, financial assistance for childcare, and other family-friendly policies are Western European workplace norms that could solve the work–family balance problem in the United States.

There are many other options of work–family policies that lead to happier and more productive workers. Some of these options include educational classes, such as classes on the wellbeing of a newborn or family, put on by the company, that has been shown to be associated with less reported work–family conflict. A room that would allow for breast milk pumping could be one of the most helpful work–family policies for a company and family. A 1995 study found 86% of breastfed infants experienced no illness during the 1-year duration of the study and another study found breastfeeding infants decreases the chances of acute infections. Breastfeeding will help the company because breastfeeding has been linked to lower health care costs. This prolonged breast feeding saved one company $240,000 in health care savings and $60,000 in reduced absenteeism. Some other work–family policies that could help the family and company include various scheduling options, such as paid vacation, flex schedules, remote work, part-time work, and job sharing. Employees who have this flexibility increase productivity and have less work–family spill over and they are less likely to miss work due to family related issues.

One extremely important aspect of all these policies is the management support and work environment that go along with it. It has been shown multiple times that the work culture influence whether employees take advantage of work–family policies. This work culture is a better predictor of use of policies than individual's needs or values. If an individual feels that using a policy will affect his/her chances of advancement he/she is more likely to refuse to use the policy. This is why management support is a big part of this work–family policy.

However, many constrains still exist. These workplace policies are largely only offered at higher salary jobs, which are once again out of reach for the poor. The huge lack of government funding at the state and federal levels also make these workplace policies unrealistic at this point.

=== Government support ===
If government support for workplace family-friendly policies or childcare subsidies was stronger, it is possible that more solutions could be attempted. For example, child care subsidies by the government actually result in less childcare and work disruptions and could impact low-income families as well by making childcare more affordable. However, government support is not at the level of other developed countries. Legislation such as the Family and Medical Leave Act had little impact on gender inequality in care work and was strongly opposed by businesses.

Fewer than half of working parents stay home when their children are sick, even though research shows that sick children recover more quickly when a parent is there. …54 percent of working women are not entitled to any paid leave for taking care of a sick child or other family members.

If our society were to follow in the footsteps of other countries who allow paid time off for taking care of sick children or even for having children, our country might be able to get rid of the welfare program. Mothers wouldn't need welfare because they could have a job and be able to take care of children. Employers would have to allow parents to leave work to take care of children and they would have to pay them for it as well. When the parent is still getting a paycheck there would be no need for welfare programs to supplement another income or for a lack of income.

== See also ==
- Family structure in the United States
- Public holidays in the United States
- Work–life balance in the United States
- Double burden
- Intra-household bargaining
- Shared earning/shared parenting marriage
- Sociology of the family
- Time bind
- Work–family conflict
