= Work intensity =

Activity in relation to the capacity for that work

Work intensity is defined as activity in relation to the capacity for that work. It is a topic that affects developed and developing countries in different ways. There are many aspects to work intensity including multitasking, time poverty, health implications, and policy considerations. Multitasking is the overlap of many activities, usually care and informal work, that negatively impacts the livelihood of people, especially women, in the developing world. Time poverty is defined as the lack of time for leisure and rest activities after time spent working. High work intensity coupled with multitasking and time poverty has a negative correlation with health outcomes. Work intensity is seldom considered when proposing new policy and legislation. As more women enter the workforce, work intensity and its implications are being brought to the forefront of policy, development, and empowerment debates.

== Multitasking ==
Due to the nature of work intensity and multitasking, women tend to be more affected than men. Work intensity is amplified by multitasking as women put forth more effort per unit of time through the performance of two or more tasks simultaneously. Women assume productive, reproductive, and managing roles in their communities, thus the demand for their time is greater. Each role requires a different amount of intensity, and the magnitude of the amount of work that women in the developing world complete is often disregarded. Current time use data and research ignores the multiplicity of roles and duties performed by women in developing nations, thus, the extent in which women multitask is vastly underreported. This creates an unfair distribution of work between men and women as women chiefly deal with the functioning of the familial unit.

While multitasking and its effects influence all socioeconomic classes, the lower, working classes tend to bear the burden of its distresses. Multitasking, more often than not, is used to mitigate the effects of low incomes. Families that cannot afford other means to take care of the daily ins and outs of running a household rely on women to complete everyday chores and care. In addition, families suffering from poverty are more likely to have both parents work, compounding the amount of labor done by women. However, the alternative to multitasking can leave women and their families in deeper poverty.

Economists are beginning to take note of the importance of correctly quantifying multitasking by looking at the role of care and unpaid work. Care work, done predominantly by women, is a main component of multitasking. Care work includes, but is not limited to, caring for children, the elderly, partners, and oneself. Unpaid work, while it includes care work, also includes activities such as cooking, cleaning, and fetching water. There is an enormous overlap between childcare and multitasking, leading to a never ending workday for many women. If employed, she returns from her job and is again put to work cooking, cleaning, and caring for others in her household. Women complete over sixty percent of unpaid household work, which is almost never factored into any productive measure and overlooked.

== Time poverty ==
Time poverty is defined as the lack of time for leisure and rest activities after time spent working. As women often serve productive, reproductive, and managing roles in their communities they are more likely to be time poor than men as their time is spread out over many activities. Especially in rural areas, women tend to work more hours than men although the time work gap varies by country. Additionally, there is a correlation between time and income poverty which further widens the time and income gap between men and women. It is the combination of informal domestic work on top of market labor that puts women at a disadvantage. Unfortunately, the alternative to being time poor is even deeper consumption poverty. This grim alternative leaves women with no other choice than to be incessantly working, often on several projects at once (internal link to multitasking). Time poverty and multitasking are extremely interconnected in that women are so time impoverished that they must do many tasks simultaneously. In household units, women are more likely to make sacrifices for the rest of the family. In sacrificing their time for more work, women are less healthy, poorly rested, and have diminished capabilities.

The feminization of labor can be seen as partly responsible for the time impoverishment of women in developing countries. Joining the formal labor market means that women have more work to do in addition to the informal care work already done within the home. As women are often paid lower wages than men, the feminization of labor contributes to income inequality and thus general gender inequality. This leaves women with few options: find gainful employment and thus increase bargaining power while at the same time becoming more time poor, or slide further into consumption poverty.

This lack of leisure time reduces the capabilities of women who are time poor. One of the ten essential human capabilities Martha Nussbaum lists in her 2004 article on women's capabilities is play, which is the capability to enjoy life and all that it has to offer. Women who are time poor are severely deficient in the play capability. As development policy slowly transitions from an income-based approach to one that is capability-based, the reduction of capabilities in time impoverished women becomes increasingly important.

== Health implications ==
Because of the time and workload associated with work intensity, there is a negative correlation between work intensity and health. While these health patterns occur in the developing and developed worlds, they manifest differently. An increase in work hours and multitasking may lead to higher monetary income and completed household tasks (for example, meals are cooked, clothes are washed, children are cared for), however the way in which women workers spend their time can lead to a deterioration in health due to stress, chronic fatigue, and a lack of recreation and sleep. In addition, working long hours in agriculture and in factories can cause nutritional deficiencies and physical strain. Lower classes tend to bear the burden of the negative health implications associated with work intensity, and they are more likely to take undesirable jobs that cause said health problems. In addition, lower class women generally take on higher degrees of work intensity.

The capabilities approach emphasizes nutrition and health as fundamental freedoms, as do many other developmental goals and approaches freedom. Health and bodily integrity are essential human capabilities vital to living a full life. A lack of health, especially unnecessarily, can be seen as an infringement on human rights.

Work intensity coupled with rest has been proven beneficial in regards to health outcomes. Rest is a form of productive consumption. Productive consumption enables the satisfaction of current needs and simultaneously increases the productive potential of labor. Rest, improved nutrition, and education can help ease the problems associated with work intensity.

== Policy considerations ==
Of the poverty eradication policies currently in place, very few of them incorporate work intensity into their reduction strategies and can often actually worsen conditions for citizens of developing countries. A common development strategy is to increase the size of a plot of land used for agriculture. While this increases a family's output, it also increases the amount of work women have to do. Another example would be moving a water source closer to a village. While women spend less time collecting water, their free time is rarely allocated to leisure and is instead allocated to more work that can often be more strenuous than the initial task of water collecting. The two development projects listed above are common in developing countries, however neither takes time poverty nor multitasking into account. A potential solution to these two problems is to include improved nutritional programs when work intensity increases. This way, women aren't forced to choose between more work and more food as the nutrition program will be improved as work intensity increases. Nobel Prize winner Amartya Sen lists adequate nutrition as an essential human freedom, and at the moment women are spending more time working that receiving sufficient nutrition and rest.

Another potential policy solution is to include rest into the workday as a form of productive consumption. Many economists want to tangibly see the reallocation of work after a certain labor-saving technology has been incorporated. However, individuals need time to recover and thus rest is as important as physical work. A big issue facing policymakers is the inadequacy of the way gender equality and time use are currently measured. Two current methods to quantify gender equality are the Gender-related Development Index (GDI) and the Gender Empowerment Measure (GEM). Although each index takes different factors into account, neither addresses time poverty or work intensity. Better economic measures to quantify care and informal work are necessary for more effective policy implementation.
