= Partner effects =

Partner effects refer to the ways in which a spouse or consensual mate influences the life of their significant other. More specifically, the effect a partner has on another's career and overall occupational status. In the past, less research had been done to observe the effects of spousal education and status position on one another because it had been assumed that the wife would adopt the husband's status. Over the past few decades, however, opportunity for women in the workplace has increased dramatically giving them a larger role in overall family income and status. Women's expanded role has brought about many changes in the opportunities for families.

== Time use and productivity ==
Partners often face time budget problems when both are working full-time. Therefore, partners have to devise a plan to balance between paid and unpaid work. Unpaid work includes domestic work around the house, such as cooking and cleaning. Couples must decide how much time each person will spend in the labor force and how much time they will spend doing domestic work. Most often this decision is weighed by comparative advantage. While this is often the most productive way to reach a balance in time, it generally places women in the domestic work and men in the labor market.

== Career opportunities ==
There are two possibilities that influence a partner's career opportunities.

The first possibility is that the spouse will positively effect on the other's career. This often happens when one can use their partner's social network to better themselves in the labor market. Research has also found that married men tend to make more money and increase wages at a faster rate versus single men. Research suggests that when a man gains a new partner, he loses some of the domestic responsibilities and can put forth more energy toward his job. This gain in ability can be seen as a positive partner effect on a career opportunity.

The second possibility of a partner's influence on a career opportunity is a negative effect. This means that by obtaining a spouse, one of the partners is now restricted in the labor force. This negative influence can be seen in the economic theory of comparative advantage. If it is more efficient for the husband to work in the labor force full-time and the wife to work at home full-time, it can be viewed as a negative effect on the wife's career. Another example of a partner's negative impact on career opportunity is when the family must move because of a job change. This is a common occurrence and can ultimately decrease the opportunities for career advancement in the new area. On the contrary, in some circumstances it can positively effect the partner and broaden their career outlook.

== Labor effects on health ==
When viewing the effects of labor on health, one would assume that with more earnings, more can purchase advanced health care. While this statement is true, there can also be other factors that affect the health care of workers and their spouses. Studies have shown that there can actually be a negative effect on people when their spouses work excessive amounts. According to Ross Stolzenberg, when a man's wife works more than forty hours a week it shows largely negative effects on the husband. Strangely, women's health on the other hand is generally not affected by the number of hours their husband works.

== See also ==
- Family economics
- Double burden
- Material feminism
- Gatekeeper parent
