= Work–family conflict =

Type of conflict

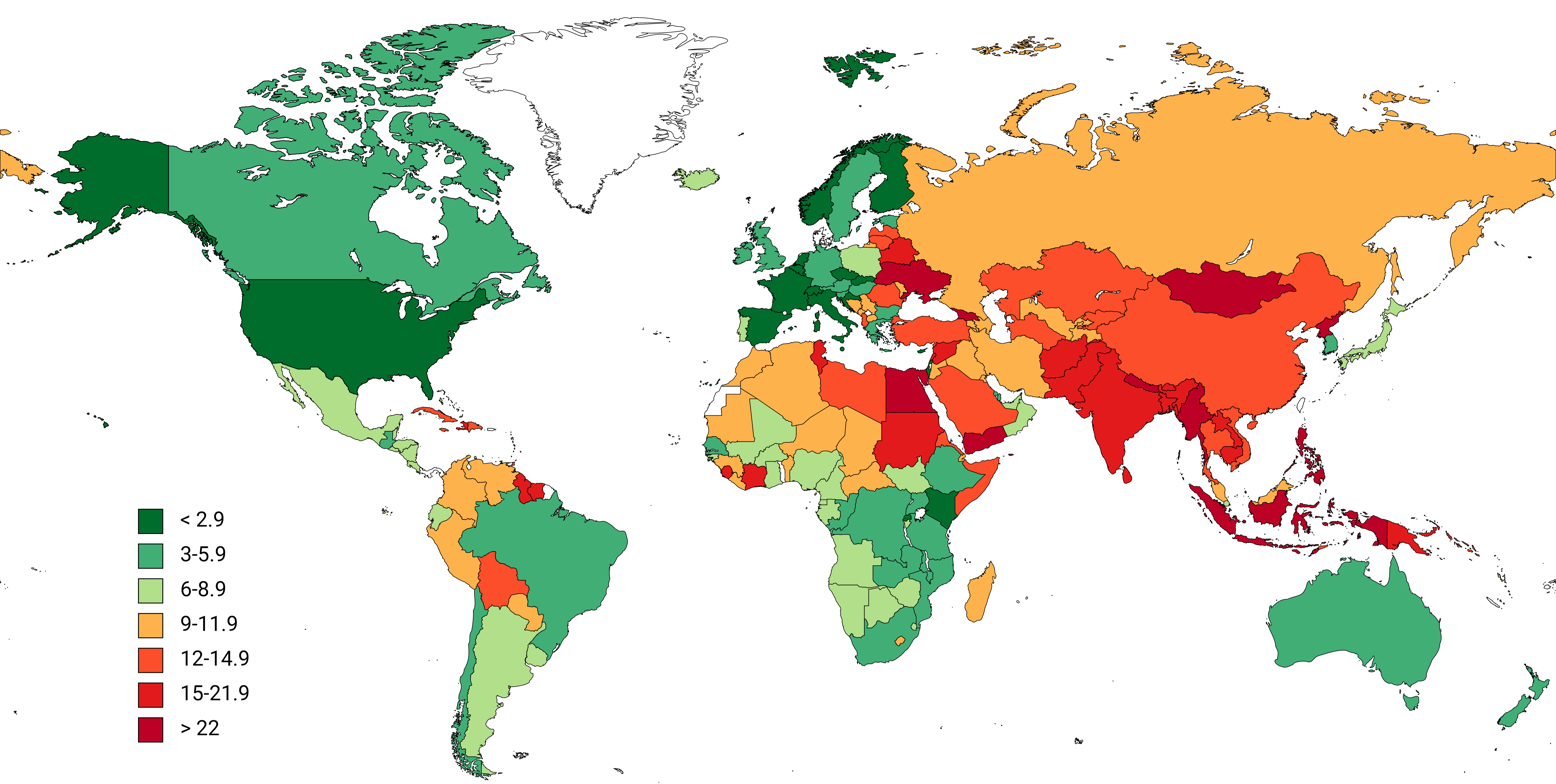
Deaths due to long working hours per 100,000 people (15+), joint study conducted by World Health Organization and International Labour Organization in 2016

Average annual hours actually worked per worker in OECD countries from 1970 to 2020

Work–family conflict occurs when an individual experiences incompatible demands between work and family roles, causing participation in both roles to become more difficult. This imbalance creates conflict at the work-life interface. It is important for organizations and individuals to understand the implications linked to work-family conflict. In certain cases, work–family conflict has been associated with increased occupational burnout, job stress, decreased health, and issues pertaining to organizational commitment and job performance.

== Foundation ==
Work–family conflict was first studied in the late 19th century. During this time period, work and income moved from inside the home (agricultural work) to outside the home (factories). Industrialization challenged the current relationship between working and family.

Boundary theory and border theory are the foundations used to study work-family conflict. Boundary theory divides social life into two interdependent sections, work and family. Individuals have different roles and responsibilities in each section. Since the sections are interdependent, two roles cannot take place at the same time. Individuals have to participate in role transformation between expectations of the workplace and expected roles within the family structure.

Border theory expands this by considering the influences each section has on the other. Border theory attempts to pin down ways to manage conflict and achieve balance between conflicting identities. Individuals may choose to treat these segments separately, moving back and forth between work and family roles (displaying boundary theory) or can decide to integrate the segments with hopes of finding balance.

== Forms of conflict ==
Conflict between work and family is bi-directional. There is a distinction between what is termed work-to-family conflict and what is termed family-to-work conflict.

Work-to-family conflict occurs when experiences and commitments at work interfere with family life, such as extensive, irregular, or inflexible work hours, work overload and other forms of job stress, interpersonal conflict at work, extensive travel, career transitions, or an unsupportive supervisor or organization. For example, an unexpected meeting late in the day may prevent a parent from picking up his or her child from school.

Family-to-work conflict occurs when experiences and commitments in the family interfere with work life, such as the presence of young children, primary responsibility for children, elder care responsibilities, interpersonal conflict within the family unit, or unsupportive family members. For example, a parent may need to take time off from work in order to take care of a sick child, or to witness a tournament or performance of a child. Family-to-work conflict is perceived to result in lower work productivity of employees.

Within work-to-family conflict and family-to-work conflict, three subtypes of conflict have been identified: time-based, strain-based, and behavior-based. Time-based conflict entails competing time requirements across work and family roles, strain-based conflict entails pressures in one role impairing performance in the second role, and behavior-based conflict entails an incompatibility of behaviors necessary for the two roles.

Although work interface with family (WIF) and family interface with work (FIW) are strongly correlated, more attention has been directed toward WIF. Research, largely attributed to the idea Ariel Russel Hochschild termed the "ideal worker", depicts the inelastic nature of work roles and responsibilities. The expectations employers hold of an "ideal worker" already rest on unrealistic assumptions about how the family should operate. Many employers expect that employees with families have someone tending to everything at home, leaving the worker unencumbered. Despite the fact that a majority of families in the U.S. are dual earning, the image of the "ideal worker" persists, presenting work-family conflict.

== Workaholism ==
Workaholism correlates with experiences of work-to-family conflict, since one's priority of work may interfere with family commitments. In its simplest form, workaholism is said to be a substantial investment in one's work. One who is said to be involved in the act of workaholism can be labeled as a workaholic. Workaholism is said to be multifaceted and multi-directional. The flexibility and satisfaction within one's job has an impact on an employee's happiness and satisfaction in the home and vice versa. An overabundance of work has been said to take priority over everyone and everything else in the lives of those infatuated with work. Excessive work prevents one from forming and maintaining intimate relationships and close friendships. Workaholics are known to spend a vast amount of time in work-related activities, which then results in the sacrifice of crucial family, social, and recreational activities. Marital problems, trouble with maintaining close relationships, and isolation from friends and family are the common issues related to workaholism and those involved.

In most recent years, employers have become more aware of the strain and stress that work can place on an employee. Companies have since started seeing their employees not only as workers, but also as people with personal and home lives. Implementation of family-responsive human resource practices and policies that promote work-family balance have become a reality as a way to reduce stress in both environments.

== Implications for organizations ==
With the struggles of work-family conflict, options are necessary to provide a solution for these problems. Loehr and Schwartz compare the extreme demands experienced by an individual in the workplace to that of a professional athlete. In both scenarios energy expenditure (stress) is experienced. Without recovery (oscillation) both cannot perform to their greatest ability, eventually leading to chronic stress, burnout, and fatigue. Persist stress without oscillation and the result will be permanent damage.

Creating an environment that values oscillation, for instance encouraging 15-minute walk breaks throughout the workday or offering corporate gym memberships, can improve employee cognition, energy, focus, and emotional intelligence. Companies, along with their bottom line and employees, win when mental and physical health are treated as equally important to cognitive capabilities. In order to gain competitive advantage, organizations are attempting to be portrayed as work–life balance–supportive employers. Companies that value employee work–life balance are able to attract and retain satisfied employees, improve worker performance, and boost employee morale and organization identification.

Work–family conflict can be diminished by establishing family-friendly policies in the workplace. Some of these policies include maternity, paternity, parental, sick leaves, and health care insurance. Organizations may provide child care options either as an on-site child care center at the business, references to close child care centers, or supplemented child care incomes for the families placing their children in a child care center.

With advances in technology, individuals who work outside the home and have intense schedules are finding ways to keep in touch with their families when they cannot physically be together. "Technology has provided a bit of an upper hand, allowing them unprecedented control and creativity in maneuvering the tenuous balance between work and family" (Temple, 2009). Organizations are now able to implement remote work policies and provide more flextime.

== Role of gender ==
The role of gender is a large factor in work-family conflict because one's gender may determine their role in the home or work place. Female representation in the workplace is a direct result of power operating covertly through ideological controls. This is illustrated by the basic assumption of an "ideal worker." Many organizations view the ideal worker as one who is "committed to their work above all else". Ideal workers are those that complete tasks beyond their formal and assigned behaviors, seen as a positive and valuable attribute to the organization. Individuals having to divide their time (and their commitments) between family and work are perceived as less dedicated to the organization. A manager's perception of a subordinate's role and commitment to the organization is positively associated with the individual's promotability.

Manager expectations of an ideal worker are often placed on female workers. Since female workers are both part of the workforce and have significant responsibilities at home, they experience a greater bearing of work-life conflict. Families in Germany with at least one child under the age of 13 and both parents in the labor force in 2018 saw moms devote nearly three times as much time to child care than fathers did. A new study suggested that women tend to face more work-family conflict than men because women have lower control over work and schedules than men. Female employees, who managers perceive to be juggling work and family commitments, were presumed to be less committed to the organization, therefore not worthy of advancement. Women in the workforce may be "inaccurately perceived to have less commitment to their organizations than their counterparts. Their advancement in organizations may be unfairly obstructed". Males are perceived to be extremely dedicated to their organization because they experience lower levels of work-family conflict.

A male individual may be unmarried and have no thought as to what "typical" family responsibilities entail because they simply have not had the experience. The male may be married, but his wife, due to the demands of the husband's position, has remained at home, tending solely to the house and children and experiencing the "typical" family responsibilities. Since the wife is the one who stays home and tends to the children, the husband is more present in the workforce, representing the higher percentage of males at the top of the organization hierarchy. Ironically, these are the individuals creating and reforming workplace policies.

The motherhood penalty is a term sociologists use when arguing that in the workplace working mothers encounter systematic disadvantages in pay, perceived competence, and benefits relative to childless women. In their place of work, women may suffer a per-child wage penalty, leading to a pay gap between mothers and non-mothers that is larger than the gap between men and women. Not only do working mothers have the burden of balancing work and home life, but they also have to prove they are as dedicated as other employees. Mothers tend to suffer less favorable job-site evaluations compared to non-mothers, stating that mothers are much less committed to their jobs, less authoritative, and less dependable than non-mothers. Hence, mothers may experience discrimination is terms of pay, hiring, and day-to-day job experience.

The way in which companies have shaped the "ideal worker" does not complement the family lifestyle, nor does it accommodate it. Long hours and near complete devotion to the profession make it difficult for working mothers to participate in, or get ahead in the workplace while maintaining a home and family.

== See also ==
- Chronic stress
- Critique of work
- Dassler brothers feud
- Emotional intelligence
- Job performance
- Job stress
- Occupational burnout
- Organizational commitment
- Organizational hierarchy
- Work-life interface
- Workaholic

== Sources ==
- Bakker, A., Demerouti, E. & Burke, R. (January 2009). Workaholism and Relationship Quality: A Spillover-Crossover Perspective. Journal of Occupational Health Psychology, 14, 23–33
- Frone, M. R., Yardley, J. K., & Markel, K. S. (1997). Developing and testing an integrative model of the work–family interface. Journal of Vocational Behavior, 50, 145–167.
- Greenhaus, J. H., & Beutell, N. J. (1985). Sources of conflict between work and family roles. Academy of Management Review, 10, 76–88.
- Kossek, E. E., & Ozeki, C. (1998). Work–family conflict, policies, and the job–life satisfaction relationship: A review and directions for organizational behavior–human resources research. Journal of Applied Psychology, 83, 139–149.
- Kossek, E., Noe, R. & DeMarr, B. (April 1999). Work-family synthesis: Individual and organizational determinants.International Journal of Conflict Management, 10, 102–129.
- Krouse, S. S., & Afifi, T. D. (2007). Family-to-work spillover stress: Coping communicatively in the workplace. The Journal of Family Communication, 7, 85–122.
- Lambert, S. J. (1990). Processes linking work and family: A critical review and research agenda. Human Relations, 43, 239–257.
- MacDermind, S. M., Seery, B. L., & Weiss, H. H. (2002). An emotional examination of the work-family interface. In N. Schmitt (Series Ed.) & R. G. Lord, R. J. Klimoski & R. K. Kanfer (Vol. Eds.), The organizational frontier series: Vol. 16. Emotions in the workplace: Understanding the structure and role of emotions in organizational behavior (pp. 402–427). San Francisco: Jossey-Bass.
- Temple, H. & Gillespie, B. (February 2009). Taking charge of work and life. ABA Journal, 95, 31–32.
