= Working class in the United States =

Economic and social class in the United States

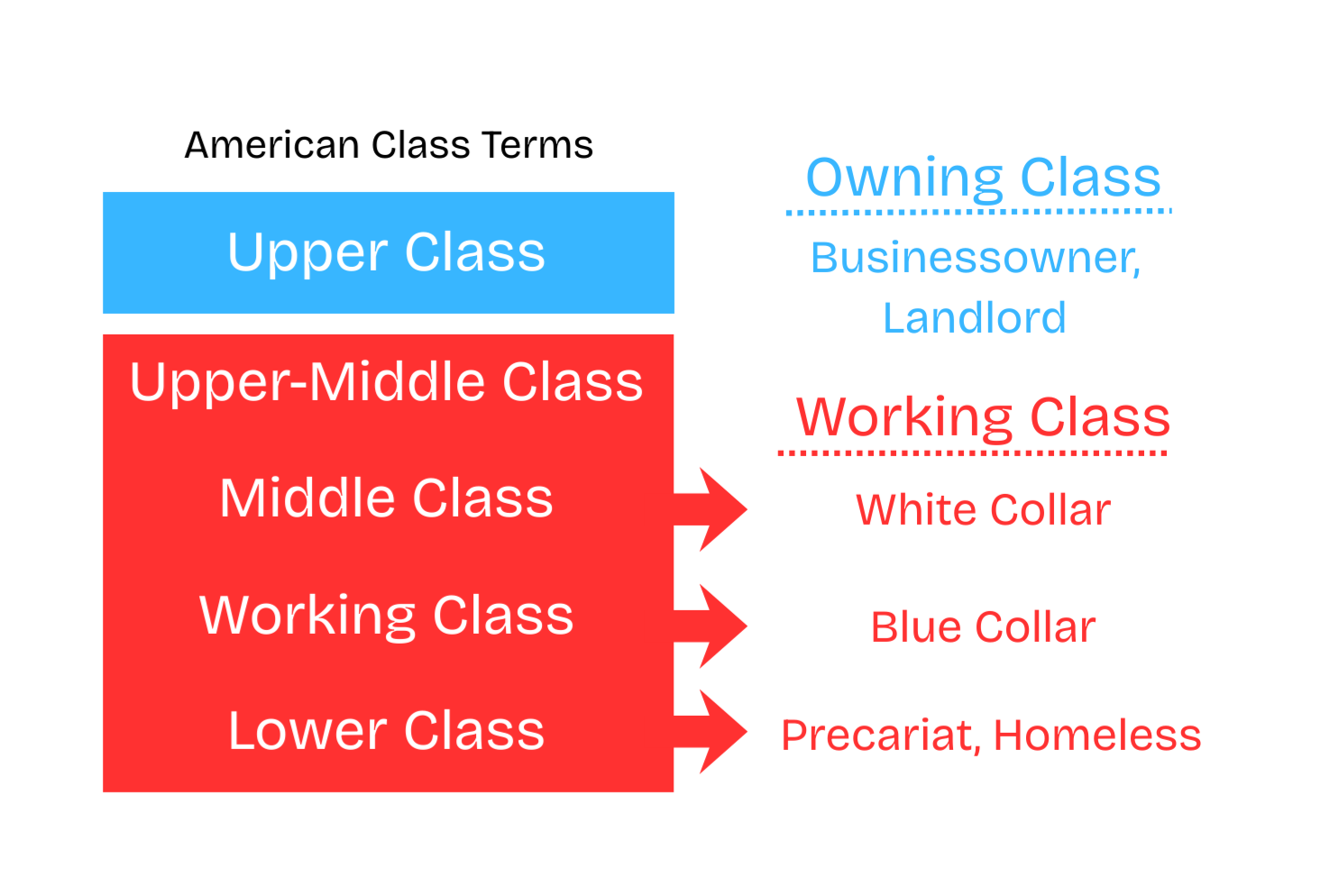
The definition of "working class" in the United States diverges from traditional class definitions which include blue-collar and white-collar workers, as well as underemployed and unemployed assetless individuals.

In the United States, the concept of a working class remains vaguely defined, and classifying people or jobs into this class can be contentious. According to Frank Newport, "for some, working class is a more literal label; namely, an indication that one is working."

Economists and pollsters in the United States generally measure the "working class" using college degrees as an indicator, rather than focusing on occupation, income, or asset ownership. Other definitions refer to those in blue-collar occupations, despite the considerable range in required skills, income, and ownership among such occupations. Many members of the working class, as defined by academic models and traditional definitions, are often described in the vernacular as middle-class, despite the term's ambiguous meaning.

Sociologists such as Dennis Gilbert and Joseph Kahl see the working class as the most populous in the United States, while other sociologists such as William Thompson, Joseph Hickey and James Henslin deem the lower middle class slightly more populous. In the class models devised by these sociologists, the working class comprises between 30% and 35% of the population, roughly the same percentages as the lower middle class. According to the class model by Dennis Gilbert, the working class comprises those between the 25th and 55th percentile of society. In 2018, 31% of Americans described themselves as working class. Retired American adults are less likely to describe themselves as "working class", regardless of the actual income or education level of the adult.

== Recent history ==
Income and wealth, by educational level (US)

Median annual salaries across educational levels varied by a factor of about 3.

Median accumulated household wealth across educational levels varied by a factor of over 50.

Since the 1970s, economic and occupational insecurity has become a major problem for American workers, their families, and their communities, to a much greater extent than their counterparts in peer countries. According to Matthew Desmond, the U.S. "offers some of the lowest wages in the industrialized world" which has "swelled the ranks of the working poor, most of whom are thirty-five or older." Jonathan Hopkin writes that the United States took the lead in implementing the neoliberal agenda in the 1980s, making it "the most extreme case of the subjection of society to the brute force of the market." As such, he argues this made the United States an outlier with economic inequality hitting "unprecedented levels for the rich democracies." Marie Gottschalk argues that "the downward slide of so many poor and working class people in the United States," and the precarious position of many in the middle class, has been "misunderstood, ignored, dismissed or mischaracterized," and helps explain the rise of Donald Trump and Bernie Sanders, much to the bafflement of the political establishment and mainstream media.

While outsourcing, the busting and decline of unionization and welfare supports, the rise of immigration, the prison-industrial complex, and unemployment have brought increased competition and considerable economic insecurity to working-class employees in the "traditional" blue-collar fields, there is an increasing demand for service personnel, including clerical and retail occupations. Sociologist Gosta Esping-Anderson describes these supervised service occupations as "junk jobs," as they fail to pay living wages in the face of asset and price inflation, fail to pay benefits, are often insecure, unstable, or temporary, and provide little work control and little opportunity for skill development or advancement. In contrast to other expensive countries with higher proportions of quality jobs, the U.S. has developed an economy where two-thirds of jobs do not require or reward higher education; the other one-third of jobs consist largely in managing the junk job workers. At the same time, political economist Radhika Desai says that working people have been encouraged, but not always permitted, to supplement their inadequate incomes with credit.

The working class is often defined as those lacking college degrees, which is a majority of American adults.

Despite, or perhaps because of the well-known limitations that the US labor market, inequality—including deep educational inequality, and other structural factors set on social mobility in the US, many commentators find more interesting the idea of class cultures. Education, for example, can pose an especially intransigent barrier in the US, and not just because of gross educational inequality; culture plays some role as well. The middle class is often recognized in the US by educational attainment, which is correlated with (but may not cause) income and wealth, especially for white men. Members of the working class commonly have a high school diploma and many have only some college education. Due to differences between middle and working class cultures, working class college students may face culture shock upon entering the post-secondary education system, with its "middle class" culture.

Labor historian Julie Greene writes that the working class of the United States is living through a Second Gilded Age "characterized by de-industrialization, the rise of the gig economy, and falling real wages." She distinguishes this from the original Gilded Age when working class people created powerful labor movements to improve wages and working conditions, whereas the second has seen a greater effort by the capitalist class and their supporters to roll back the labor movement and protections for workers, which has led to "greater acquiescence to exploitation." The disappearance of any alternatives to capitalism globally, in particular the dissolution of the Soviet Union and China's economic liberalization, she argues, has made this process easier.

Some experts, including the economists Anne Case and Angus Deaton and psychiatrist Anna Zeira, attribute rising diseases of despair, which are impacting mostly the working class, to what they see as flaws in contemporary capitalism: neoliberal capitalist policies which shifted political and economic power from labor to capital, (with an emphasis on cutting social services), weakened unions, and deregulated markets, which resulted in empowered corporations, increased outsourcing and rent-seeking, and increased economic inequality as wealth was transferred from the bottom to the top. Such policies, they argue, have been extremely toxic to the working class and have exacerbated emotional distress.

Scholars including business theorist Jeffrey Pfeffer and political scientist Daniel Kinderman posit that contemporary employment practices in the United States relating to the increased performance pressure from management, and the hardships imposed on working class people such as toxic working environments, precarity, and long hours, could be responsible for 120,000 excess deaths annually, making the workplace the fifth leading cause of death in the United States. Elizabeth S. Anderson argues that most workers in the contemporary U.S. are governed by private corporate dictatorships in the workplace, in which CEOs and management have sweeping and unaccountable power over workers and not only strictly regulate their speech, dress and manners on the job, but under employment-at-will, often dominate off-duty life by firing workers for lifestyle choices, recreational activities, political speech, social media posts, or voicing criticism about working conditions.

=== Culture ===
Social connectedness to people of higher income levels is a strong predictor of upward income mobility. However, data shows substantial social segregation correlating with economic income groups.

Some researchers try to measure the cultural differences between the American middle class and working class and suggest their ahistorical sources and implications for educational attainment, future income, and other life chances. Sociologist Melvin Kohn argues that working class values emphasize external standards, such as obedience and a strong respect for authority as well as little tolerance for deviance. This is opposed to middle-class individuals who, he says, emphasize internal standards, self-direction, curiosity and a tolerance for non-conformity.

... views were quite varied at every class level, but the values we are calling working-class become increasingly common at lower class levels... Kohn's interpretation... is based on the idea that the middle-class parents who stress the values of self-control, curiosity, and consideration are cultivating capacities for self-direction... while working-class parents who focus on obedience, neatness, and good manners are instilling behavioral conformity.

— Dennis Gilbert, The American Class Structure, 1998.

Other social scientists, such as Barbara Jensen, show that middle-class culture tends to be highly individualistic, while working-class culture tends to center around the community. Such cultural value differences are thought to be closely linked to an individual's occupation. Working-class employees tend to be closely supervised and thus emphasize external values and obedience.

Working class culture can be broken down into subgroup tendencies. According to Rubin (1976), there is a differential in social and emotional skills both between working-class men and women and between the blue-color working-class and college-educated workers. Working-class men are characterized by Rubin as taking a rational posture while women are characterized as being more emotional and oriented towards communication of feelings. This constellation of cultural issues has been explored in the popular media, for example, the television shows, Roseanne or All in the Family featuring Archie Bunker and his wife Edith Bunker. These popular television programs also explored generational change and conflict in working-class families. One does need to note, however, that there are great variations in cultural values among the members of all classes and that any statement pertaining to the cultural values of such large social groups needs to be seen as a broad generalization.

Further, if the hypothesis that culture primarily produces class were true, such a non-dialectical, causal relationship pertains more validly in some low-social mobility societies. Scandinavian countries, by contrast, have discovered that removing structural barriers (and to some extent broadly valorizing working class culture) is effective in increasing social mobility, if not in eradicating social class under capitalism.

=== Political role of the white working class ===
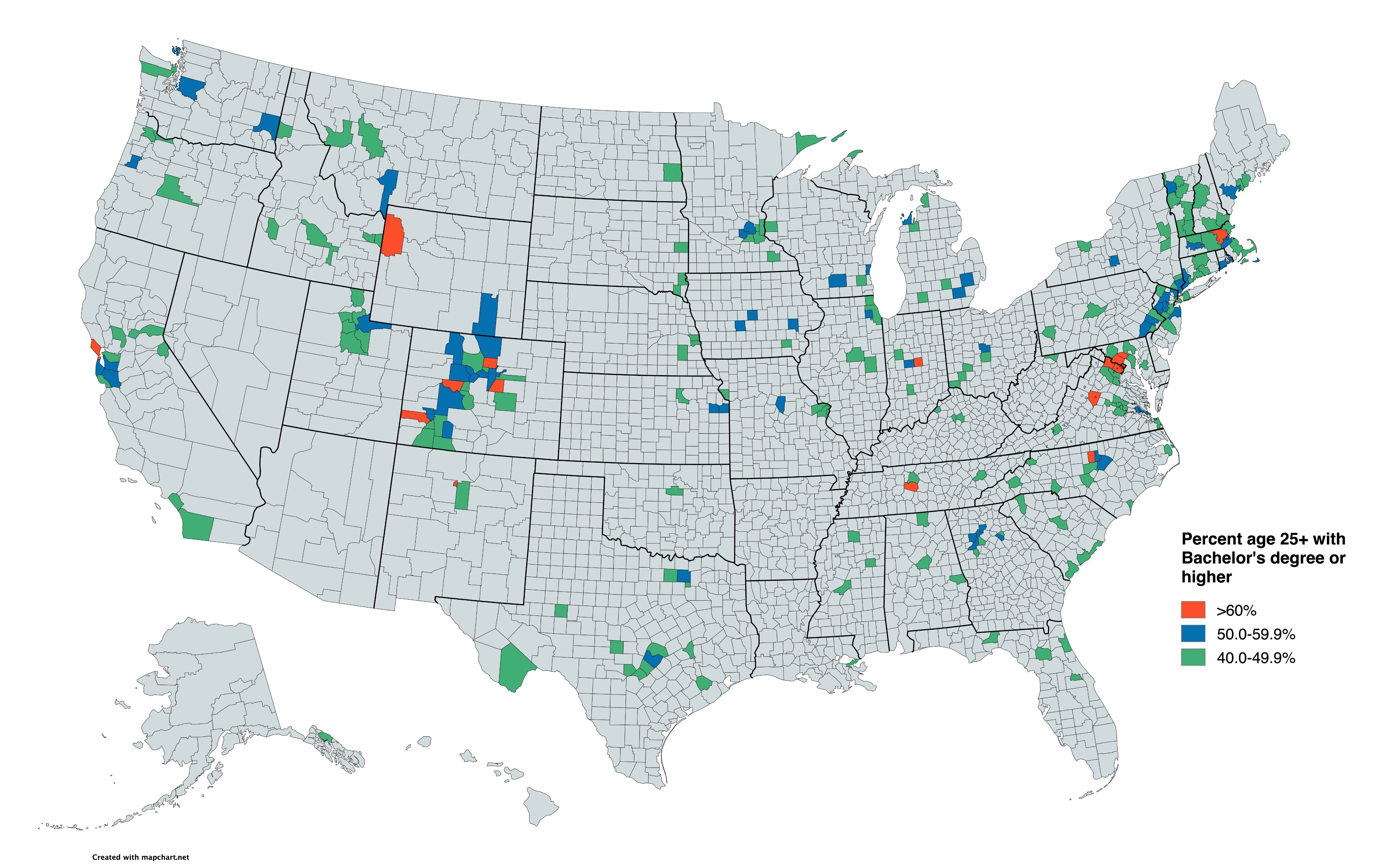
Top and bottom:
A map of the county swing from 2012 to 2016. Trump's gains among working class voters, particularly in the Midwest, were decisive in winning the Electoral College. A map of the most college-educated counties in the United States

According to Thomas B. Edsall, an experienced political commentator, the white working class, defined as non-Hispanic whites who have not completed college, plays a pivotal role in the politics of the United States. This segment of the electorate was solidly Democratic during the New Deal, but its support of Democratic candidates steadily eroded to about 50% by the end of the 20th century. It is also diminishing as a portion of the electorate, both due to increased educational opportunities and because whites make up a declining share of the electorate overall.

At the turn of the millennium in the 2000 presidential election, whites without college degrees became a Republican demographic stronghold. They had been approximately evenly split in the 1996 presidential election, but swung hard towards George W. Bush, who won by them a 17% margin that year. Whites without college degrees continued to become more Republican before Donald Trump first ran for president in 2016.

The political role of the white working class was re-examined during the 2016 United States presidential election, due to the strong support for Donald Trump by white working class voters. Trump's victory was in part credited to this support in swing states such as Wisconsin, Michigan, and Pennsylvania, that had previously been won by his Democratic predecessor Barack Obama. Professional pollsters did not predict such a large swing for Trump among the white working class. According to Nate Cohn, the gains that Trump's opponent Hillary Clinton made among other voter classes "were overwhelmed by Mr. Trump's huge appeal to white voters without a degree." Voter turnout among white voters who did not have a college degree had increased by 3 percent from 2012 to 2016, despite the composition of white voters who did not have a college degree decreasing by 1 percent from 2012 to 2016.

According to Nate Silver, educational attainment, not income, predicted who would vote for Trump in 2016. Specifically, Trump gained among White voters without college degrees and lost ground among White voters with college degrees. The most college-educated counties in the United States had the smallest swings to or shifted against Trump. This can be seen by comparing the swing map and the map of the most college-educated counties. Whites with college degrees did not become a Democratic stronghold until 2016. They had only voted for Lyndon B. Johnson 52-48% in his 1964 landslide victory, even as Johnson won 61-39%.

According to Nate Cohn, Trump made his largest gains among the least-educated and lowest-income White voters, while Hillary Clinton made her largest gains among the best-educated and most affluent White voters. In particular, Trump gained the most among Whites who did not graduate from college, while Whites with graduate degrees dramatically shifted towards Clinton. Clinton still won the lowest-income voters as a whole.

According to Lynn Vavreck and colleagues, survey data revealed that economic insecurities mattered to Trump voters most when connected to a racial animus, with the job losses being specifically important when lost to an out-group, in a composite they called 'racialized economics'. Trump supporters have in turn been claimed to have actually have their jobs threatened by Trump's policies, but have continued supporting him. Jonathan Metzl has claimed that low-income white men in Missouri, Tennessee and Kansas oppose policies that support people in their position because they believe that undeserving groups would benefit from them. Arlie Russell Hochschild has studied working-class people in Louisiana, and come to the conclusion that what is motivating them is a feeling, which she calls the Deep Story:

You are patiently standing in a long line leading up a hill, as in a pilgrimage. You are situated in the middle of this line, along with others who are also white, older, Christian, predominantly male, some with college degrees, some not. Just over the brow of the hill is the American Dream, the goal of everyone waiting in line.... You've suffered long hours, layoffs, and exposure to dangerous chemicals at work, and received reduced pensions. You have shown moral character through trial by fire, and the American Dream of prosperity and security is a reward for all of this, showing who you have been and are—a badge of honor.... Look! You see people cutting in line ahead of you! You're following the rules. They aren't. As they cut in, it feels like you are being moved back. How can they just do that? Who are they? Some are black. Through affirmative action plans, pushed by the federal government, they are being given preference for places in colleges and universities, apprenticeships, jobs, welfare payments, and free lunches.... Women, immigrants, refugees, public sector workers—where will it end? Your money is running through a liberal sympathy sieve you don't control or agree with.... But it's people like you who have made this country great. You feel uneasy. It has to be said: the line cutters irritate you.... You are a stranger in your own land. You do not recognize yourself in how others see you. It is a struggle to feel seen and honored.... [Y]ou are slipping backward.

== See also ==
- Diseases of despair
- Social class in the United States
- Strangers in Their Own Land
- Working: People Talk About What They Do All Day and How They Feel About What They Do – extensive oral history from American workers in the 1970s
- White trash
