= Time binding =

Time binding can refer to

- human progress as seen from the perspective of general semantics, an educational discipline created by Alfred Korzybski in the 1930s
- time bind, a sociological concept relevant to family and labor, introduced by Arlie Russell Hochschild in the 1990s
