= Feeling rules =

Feeling rules are socially shared norms that influence how people want to try to feel emotions in given social relations. This concept was introduced by sociologist Arlie Russell Hochschild in 1979. Hochschild's 1983 book, The Managed Heart: Commercialization of Human Feeling, discusses feeling rules in greater depth, especially in the occupational worlds of flight attendants and bill collectors. Hochschild draws on the work of sociologist Erving Goffman as well as labor scholar Harry Braverman to discuss the dramaturgical demands and emotional labor entailed by jobs in the service sector, in which workers must "perform" certain roles that entail abiding by certain feeling rules (e.g. "friendly and dependable"). She notes that women are more likely to have such jobs than men, and that analysis of feeling rules may therefore be especially relevant to understanding the gendered dimensions of labor. This work foreshadows themes from her later analyses of women's work, both paid and unpaid, e.g. in The Commercialization of Intimate Life (2003).

This work is part of the broader sociology of emotions, which notes that socialization plays an important role in how people experience, interpret, and express emotions, including the situations that evoke a range of feelings. All human beings learn certain feeling rules, but these feeling rules may differ widely depending on the society in which one grows up and one's social position and social identity, including gender and ethnic identity and socio-economic status. Feeling rules are flexible and the ways in which they impinge on one's experience in different settings influences one's personality, both in specific contexts (e.g. at work, home, school, or in different social groups) and over time.

== Effects ==
=== Race and the workplace ===
Race not only plays an important role in the way that employees act with each other, but also how employees act toward customers based on what race they are associated with. People expect others to behave in a certain manner due to what race they identify or associate with. Race influences and changes the way we see and view others.

Roxana Harlow, a sociologist, conducted extensive research on black colleges and professors. Harlow's research showed that white college students viewed their professors as "unintelligent" and "inferior" simply because of the color of their skin and not the measurement of their knowledge. In a classroom setting, white students were shown to give black professors a hard time and question every statement that their professor made. Whereas, if they were in a classroom with a white professor that had made the same statement that a black professor had made previously, the white professor was not questioned and was viewed as knowledgeable. In spite of this baseless challenge to their authority, the black professor maintained their composure and adhered to the feeling rules demanded by the setting.

In a workplace, feeling rules are established and are expected to be followed, but there is a double standard on the feeling rules applied to the white workers versus black workers.

=== Status ===
Due to feeling rules, people of lower status or standing are expected to behave in an ashamed or emotional manner versus a cold or angry manner. By showing that they are ashamed of their current standing, the people of higher status are more likely to help them out and have pity on them versus those who do not show shame or pity for their current state. People respond better to seeing people on the streets asking for money or rambling through trash to find items. People of higher standings respond back by giving that individual of lower status clothes, food, and money. Our generosity is dependent on the manner of the poor individual. A poor individual who acted in an indifferent or prissy manner would not receive any response from the financially stable individual, not because his or her current situation had changed, in fact that person is still the poor individual you saw a few minutes ago, but in fact your demeanor had changed due to feeling rules.

Feeling rules gives people the expectancy that individuals of lower status should act in a pitiful and ashamed manner just because of their standing. Feeling rules affect our status because it dictates how one should act just because of their economic/ financial standing.

An experiment was conducted to show how people would react if they saw an ad with a person who was angry about being poor and another person who was shameful about being in poverty. After viewing the ad, people were more willingly to give money to the person who ashamed about being poor versus the person who was angry about being poor. Since the individual who was angry about being in poverty broke the feeling rule of what is expected our people of lower class, little to none donations were received in their favor. People of lower status that displayed no sense of self-pity or dissatisfaction gave people of higher status a harder time to sympathize with them thus proving that expressing shame was more effective and when anger was expressed there was little to no help being provided.

=== Gender ===
Around the world, men get paid more than women. Feeling rules require men and women to act a certain way, and in fear of breaking that norm, these rules stay in place. Women are associated with being sweet and innocent, whereas men are associated with being tough and strong. People are assigned jobs based on their gender. Since women are usually seen as beings that can control their anger, they are most likely enlisted in jobs that require them to use their looks or charms. Men, who are seen as tough, are usually in jobs that require them to use that toughness or anger in order to deliver some type of means.

Women in traditional and middle-class families rely on men to make or give them money. In response to the men providing, the women in a sense feel as if they have to repay the men back by hugging, kissing or celebrating the man. Since the women do not have the financial capability of repaying the man, the women use emotional means in order to thank or repay the man for what he has provided for them. If the man had provided the money for the woman and she in return did not act by hugging or kissing him, she would be seen an ungrateful because the feeling rules calls for her to feel joy or happiness for what the man has done for her.

Children learn their habits and emotional skills from their parents. Men are seen as beings that are not capable of controlling their feelings or emotions because they were not taught or required to as a child. Males obtain jobs such as bill collector, taxi driver, and construction worker because many of those jobs do not rely heavily on emotional labor. Hochschild showed that male flight attendants showed more power and tolerated less abuse from passengers than female flight attendants. Since people generally associate males with being tough and associate females with being sweet, feeling rules makes them feel appalled when a woman behaves in a tough manner, but when a male behaves in the same way, it is seen as acceptable.

== Exploitation ==
A large portion of workers have jobs or careers that requires them to use their feelings, or "emotional labor" as Hochschild calls it, in the workplace. Their reactions and actions are based on the way they see how other people react or express their feelings. Companies and corporations see this and use it to exploit workers in order to maximize profits.

Hochschild gives a clear example on how companies maximize their profits through the use of feeling rules by viewing the job of a flight attendant. A flight attendant's job requires emotional labor. The flight attendance uplifts the customer through his or her demeanor and expression of feelings. A flight attendant who is constantly smiling or asking the customer how they are doing is more comforting to a customer versus if a flight attendant who rolls their eyes and rarely smiles. The feeling rules for a flight attendant calls for them to be happy, calm, and to suppress their negative feelings. Customers who see the way the flight attendant upholds themselves are more likely to come back if the experience was pleasant. Which is why many airlines like Delta, which was rated as one of the top airlines calls and requires these feeling rules at the workplace. In a way, this is beneficial to the companies and the customer because the customer is satisfied and keeps coming back, which makes the company more money. However, at the same time, it can be harmful to the flight attendant because they are not able to express their feelings, but rather suppress their feelings for the benefit of others.

== Framing rules ==
In Hochschild's later work, the concept of feeling rules is accompanied by that of framing rules, which are the context in which feeling rules operate. Framing rules, in Hochschild's account, are "the rules according to which we ascribe definitions or meanings to situations", which may be moral (relating to what is morally right), pragmatic (relating to what is possible) or historical (relating to individual or collective histories).
