= Commercialization of love =

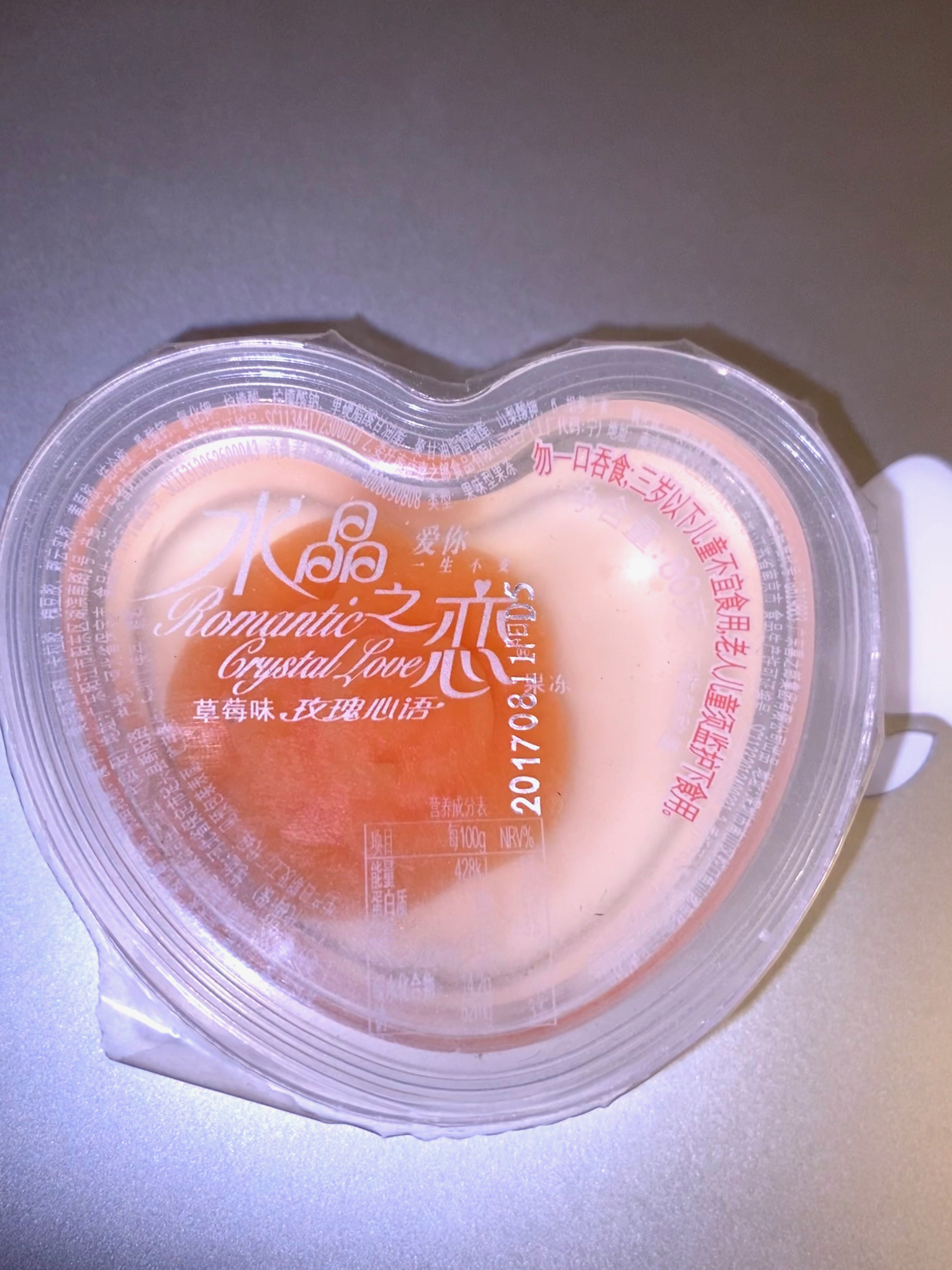
Romance-themed jello

The commercialization of love refers to the process of turning romantic relationships and expressions of love into marketable commodities. Overall, commercialization encourages people to express their feelings through purchased goods (gifts such as flowers, chocolates, and jewelry) and services, often driven by social norms and marketing strategies.

== Sociological development ==
The commercialization of love is the ongoing process of infiltration of commercial and economical stimuli in the daily life of lovers and the association of monetary and non-monetary symbols and commodities in the love relationships.

The application of Habermas’ theory is helpful to fully understand the discussion of the relationship between the market and love. From the model of a two-tiered society postulated by Habermas (comprising the sphere of the systems and the life-world), Frankfurt School has affirmed that when romantic stimuli made with commercial proposes infiltrate the daily life of lovers it causes an undesired colonization of the life-world, thus reaffirming the irreducible contradiction between the economy and love.

In contemporary societies, the economy is present in several spheres of love, offering cultural products that embody its ideals and feelings and providing the contexts in which to experience the romantic rituals (i.e. love manuals, sex therapists and marriage crisis counselors).

Romantic love can be defined, according to Sérgio Costa, as a historical-cultural model that branches into five dimensions:

- In the field of the emotions, romantic love expresses itself in “a bond with the other that knows no more ardent desire than the yearning to lead one's own life in the body of the loved one”.
- As an idealization, it promises the individual full recognition of the others’ singularities (dimensions, peculiarities and individual idiosyncrasies).
- As a relationship model, it historically combines a fusion of sexual passion and emotional affection (i.e. marriage, love and family).
- As a cultural practice, romantic love corresponds to a repertoire of discourses, actions and rituals by means of which amorous emotions are evoked, perceived, transmitted and intensified.
- On the subject of social interactions, it corresponds to a radicalized form of what Luhmann described as "interpersonal interpenetration".

Two sociologists, in particular, have debated and analyzed in depth the theme of commercialization of love related to our society: Eva Illouz and Arlie R. Hochschild.

=== Eva Illouz ===
Eva Illouz is a professor of sociology at the Hebrew University of Jerusalem. Much of Illouz's research focuses on topics and themes such as the study of culture, communication and especially emotions. In particular, the theme of commercialization, or commodification, of love is analyzed in her first book Consuming the Romantic Utopia: Love and the Cultural Contradictions of Capitalism (1997), where she describes how capitalism has transformed emotional patterns. At the beginning of the book, Illouz examines how romantic love has changed over time due to the newly expanding mass markets of leisure. This change led to the creation of a new process called the romanticization of commodities. The romanticization of commodities is a process by which commodities play a crucial role in experiencing emotions such as love or romance. In the 1930s, commodities of any kind such as jewelry, household appliances and even basic generic products were advertised in newspapers, magazines and also in movies as essential indicators that would enable people to fully live and experience romance. Throughout the book, Illouz deals with another process: the commodification of romance. She states that the practice of “dating” replaced the practice of “calling on a woman.” This shift consequently moved romantic encounters from the home sphere to the sphere of consumption, i.e. going out to the cinema or having dinner in a fancy restaurant. The inscription of the romantic encounter into the leisure consumption’s sphere, due to the practice of dating, marked the entrance of romance in the market. All this was made possible, on one hand, by the availability of some goods and services such as cars or leisure travels that, until then, were reserved to the upper classes and, on the other, by the middle-classes’ adoption of working class modes of entertainment, such as going to the movie theatre.

=== A.R. Hochschild ===
Arlie Russell Hochschild is a sociologist and a professor emerita at the Berkeley University of California. During her career, she studied and examined topics like market culture, family global patterns of care work, and the relationships between culture and emotion.

She analyzed the linkage between love and market in several works, including The Outsourced Self: Intimate Life in Market Times (2012) and The Commercialization of Intimate Life: Notes from Home and Work (2003).

In her essay "The Commodity Frontier" (contained in The Commercialization of Intimate Life: Notes from Home and Work), she argued that the commodity frontier (the boundary between market commodities and emotions) has a double aspect: it is developed by both the market-place and the family. On the market side, this frontier represents an opportunity for commercial companies to develop new markets for products that, in the past, were associated with the familial environment (for example nannies, birthday party planners, personal chefs). On the other hand, the supply of the products increased, alongside a growing number of families' wants or desires to consume them. This particular market targets above all single men and women. Parents are also targeted by this market, especially those who spend most of their time working outside the house without being able to devote their time to family or emotional relationships. These services have become affordable for rich people, while lower or middle class members become the service providers. Besides, “in their more recent incarnation, the commercial substitutes family activities often turn out to be better than the real thing”. Therefore, companies do not compete against each other, but with families. Commodification is moving into private life and desires, creating ambivalence. By selling goods and services that simulate a family-like activities, commercial companies tap into consumers' nostalgia for authentic familial experiences. However, by purchasing these goods and services, Hochschild argues that consumers are inadvertently enhancing the commodification of these practices.

== Examples in modern society ==
=== Valentine’s Day ===
Valentine's Day, also known as Saint Valentine's Day, is a religious celebration observed on 14 February each year, also if in some countries it is celebrated in different occasions. In Russia and in the Eastern Orthodox Church in general Valentines’ day is celebrated on 6 and 30 July, while in Brazil the Dia de São Valentim is recognized on 12 June. During this day, traditionally, lovers exchange symbols and commodities to show their sentiments to each other. This tradition developed during the 19th century in England, where people started to express their love for each other by donating flowers, offering sweets and exchanging handwritten greeting cards (known as "valentines"), that rapidly were replaced with mass-produced ones. In the later 20th and early 21st centuries, this Valentine's Day tradition spread to other countries, arriving in some East Asian countries with globalization and concentrated marketing strategies, becoming a worldwide celebration differentiated in each country with several peculiarities and behaviors.

=== Online dating ===
Online dating has become an increasingly prevalent way of finding dates or partners in the twenty-first century. Websites like Plenty of Fish or OkCupid and apps like Tinder and Hinge give users access to a large number of profiles to interact with to pursue romantic or sexual goals. These platforms use advertisements and premium memberships to commercialize their user traffic. Some criticize the outcomes of these apps, saying the large number of options and the need to brand oneself creates an environment that commodifies romantic pursuits.

=== Outsourcing of care and love ===
In her essay “Love and Gold”, Hochschild explains that nowadays the world is facing a particular global trend: the increase of care and love importation from poor countries to rich nations. Professionals from the developing countries leave their workplaces for better job opportunities and higher salaries in richer countries, usually in Europe or in the United States. However, this trend widens the gap between poor and rich countries. Today, there is a parallel trend in which care workers started to leave developing countries to care for children, elders, and sick people in richer nations. Therefore, due to the growing demand for care workers, a large number of women is migrating in order to find jobs as nurses and nannies. These jobs allow women to send home enough money to sustain their families. In the words of Hochschild: “migration has become a private solution to a public problem”.

Half of the world's migrants are now constituted by women, who emigrate to find mostly domestic jobs. In this process, not only time and energy are involved, but also love; in this situation, love is considered a resource that is extracted from one place and "consumed" somewhere else. As reported by Hochschild : "If love is a resource, it's a renewable resource; it creates more of itself".

When wealthy families invite nannies to care for their children, Hochschild argues this represents a displacement of their love towards their own children. Many families welcome the fact that the nanny would import her native culture values. They identify their care practices as more relaxed, patient and joyful.

Love as a resource is not just extracted from poor countries and then imported in the richest ones. It is created, or rather assembled, with elements that come from both cultural environments. The love that nannies express, once migrated, towards children is partially produced in the richer countries, and it is also the outcome of money, ideology, loneliness and yearning for their sons and daughters. The suffering of these women is not visible to the nannies’ employers; they just focus on the love that nannies show towards their children. Therefore, nanny’s love becomes a "thing itself. It is unique, private – fetishized". While objectifying a concept, we start to consider it outside its natural context. By isolating the concept of care from the context in which is produced, we unconsciously separate the logic of nanny love from the economic and capitalist context in which is created.

== In popular culture ==
=== Dating websites ===
- Match.com
- eHarmony
- OkCupid
- Perfectmatch.com
- BeautifulPeople.com

=== Dating-based reality shows ===
- The Bachelor
- Temptation Island
- Love in the Wild
- The Cougar
- If You Are The One

=== Nannies in movies and television programs ===
- Mary Poppins
- Mrs. Doubtfire
- Nanny McPhee
- Nanny 911
- Supernanny

== See also ==
- Capitalism
- Commodification
- Commoditization
- Consumerism
- Consumption
- Love
