= Commodification =

Transformation of goods, services, ideas and people into commodities or objects of trade

Commodification is the process of transforming inalienable, free, or gifted things (objects, services, ideas, nature, personal information, people) into commodities, or objects for sale. It has a connotation of losing an inherent quality or social relationship when something is integrated by a capitalist marketplace. Concepts that have been argued as being commodified include broad items such as the body, intimacy, public goods, animals and holidays.

== History ==
=== Terminology ===
The earliest use of the word commodification dates from 1975. Use of the concept of commodification became common with the rise of critical discourse analysis in semiotics. The terms commodification and commoditization are sometimes used synonymously, to describe the process of making commodities out of goods, services, and ideas.

However, other authors distinguish them, with commodification used in social contexts to mean that a non-commercial good has become commercial, typically with connotations of "corrupted by commerce", while commoditization is used in business contexts to mean when the market for an existing product has become a commodity market, where products are interchangeable and there is heavy price competition. In a quip: "Microprocessors are commoditized. Love is commodified."

=== In Marxist theory ===
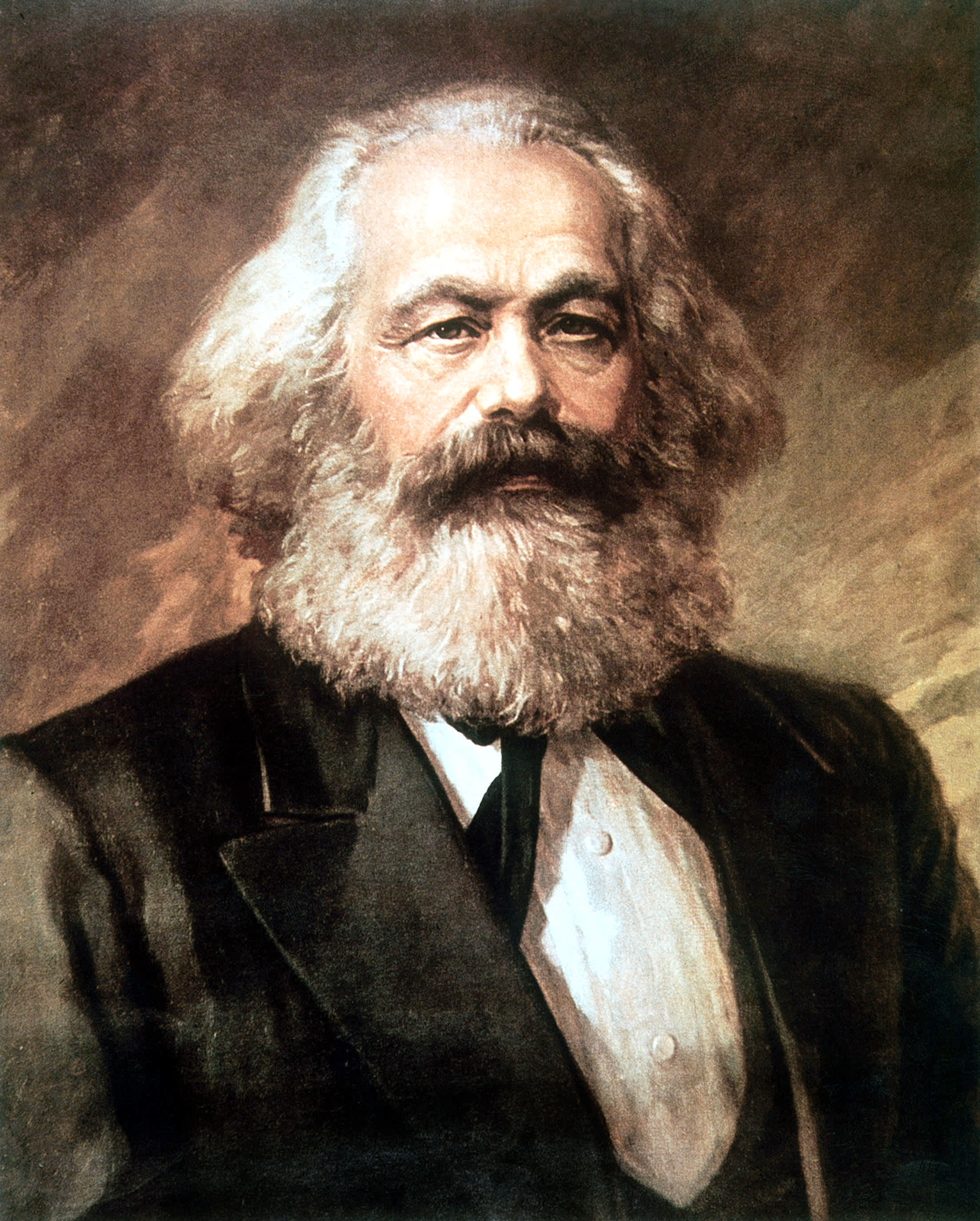
Karl Marx considered commodity a cell-form of capitalism.

The Marxist understanding of commodity is distinct from its meaning in business. The commodity form plays a key role throughout Karl Marx's work; with him considering the commodity as a cell-form of capitalism and a key starting point for an analysis of this politico-economic system. Marx extensively criticized the social impact of commodification under the names of commodity fetishism and alienation.

Prior to being turned into a commodity, an object has a "specific individual use value". After becoming a commodity, that same object has a different value: the amount for which it can be exchanged for another commodity. According to Marx, this new value of the commodity is derived from the time taken to produce the good, and other considerations are obsolete, including morality, environmental impact, and aesthetic appeal.

Marx claimed that everything would eventually be commodified: "the things which until then had been communicated, but never exchanged, given, but never sold, acquired, but never bought – virtue, love, conscience – all at last enter into commerce."

=== Mass communication studies ===
Media, as a culture industry, is apparent from the rise of mass communications to monetize a populace for profit. Research in critical cultural studies of media effects identify commodification of culture as a recent large contributing force for the disruption of a society by mass media. An example is the display of American culture to the population within its borders and abroad. The commodity being sold is the United States, but mediated to show only the most exciting, dramatic, attention-getting, emotion-rousing aspects. Media corporations are expert at analyzing and selecting appealing elements of the culture, then repackaging and enhancing those elements for a wide audience. The quest for large viewership creates an image that does not show boring, unpleasant, or minority aspects of the United States. The distribution of the alternate form of the culture, for profit, causes misconceptions and stereotyping along with disruption of the original folk culture. Within the United States, the commodification of culture is the mediated view of American society accepted as the culture and even advanced by the culture depicted; the example given is hip-hop and rap music artists stars "selling out". The United States, with media corporations less prone to governmental interference, is successful at spreading American culture worldwide.

== Life ==
=== Human ===
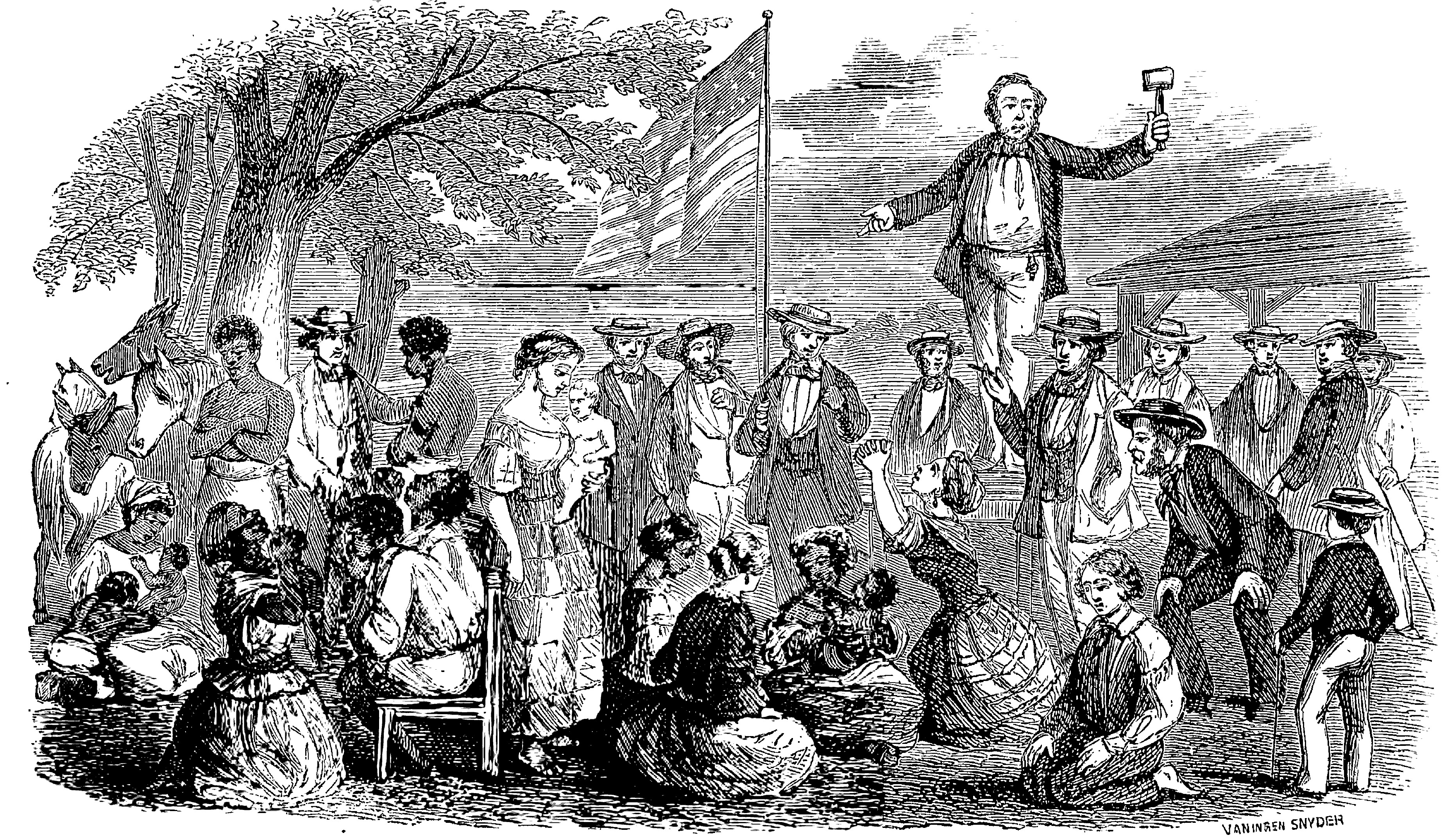
Human flesh at auction by Van Ingen Snyder.

Commodification of humans have been discussed in various context, from slavery to surrogacy. Auctions of cricket players by Indian Premier League, Big Bash League and others is also discussed to be a case of human commodification. Virginity auctions are a further example of self-commodification. Human commodity is a term used in case of human organ trade, paid surrogacy (also known as commodification of the womb), and human trafficking. According to Gøsta Esping-Andersen, people are commodified or 'turned into objects' when selling their labour on the market to an employer.

=== Self-commodification ===
Personal information through social networking services, such as music purchases, how people identify, and user profiles are aggregated and sold to corporations and businesses for microtargeting, advertising and marketing.

Social media influencers are also a recent examples of self-commodification. A travel blogger is an instance of a mediated micro-celebrity, the social-media influencer, targeting a niche audience interested in visiting exotic locales. Social media networks expand the reach of this focused audience to make influencing a profitable profession. They commodify themselves by offering online journals, advice, thoughts, experiences along with photographs and videos, then make money by selling books, self-branding, blog subscriptions, and advertorials. Trust and an increased audience are built by expressing a conversational style, a seemingly real experience by a real person, allowing users connect to the blogger as a friendly voice offering advice on travel choices.

== Culture ==
Commodification of culture refers to the process by which market forces change the very fabric of cultures. Through consumer capitalism, companies are able to influence things such as style, love and language.

=== Holidays ===
Many holidays such as Christmas, Halloween or Valentine's Day have been argued as having become commodified. The commodification of a holiday refers to making celebrations necessarily commercial and based on material goods, like gift giving, elaborate decorations, trick or treating, and card giving. Modern celebrations of many holidays are now more related to the commercial practices and profitable tactics than they are to the holidays' origins. For some holidays, like Halloween, there are arguments that the commodification of the original holiday turned it into the celebrations that people now love. The commodification of other holidays, like Christmas, sparks arguments about undoing the commercialization and getting back to the intended spirit of the holiday.

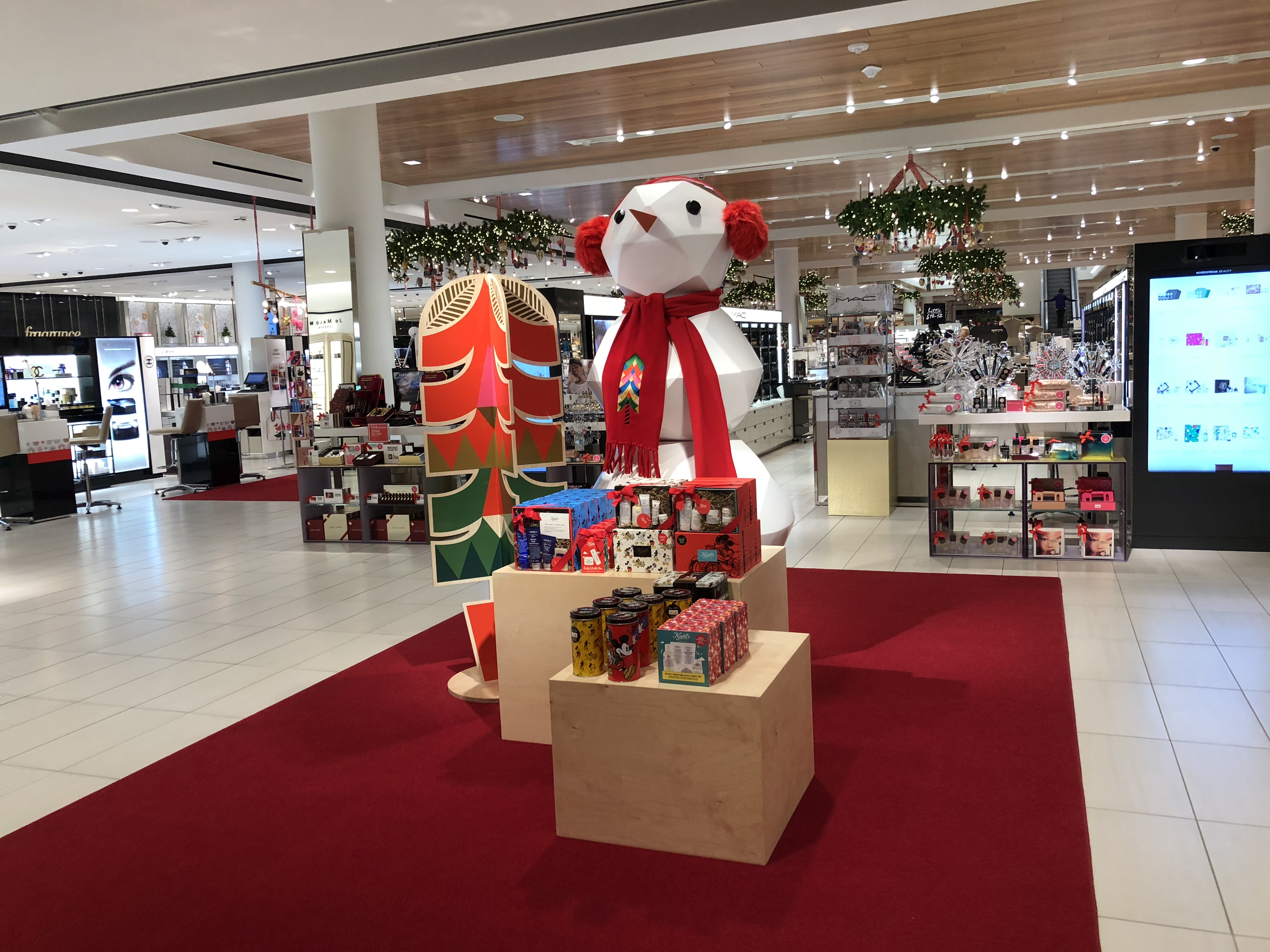
Christmas

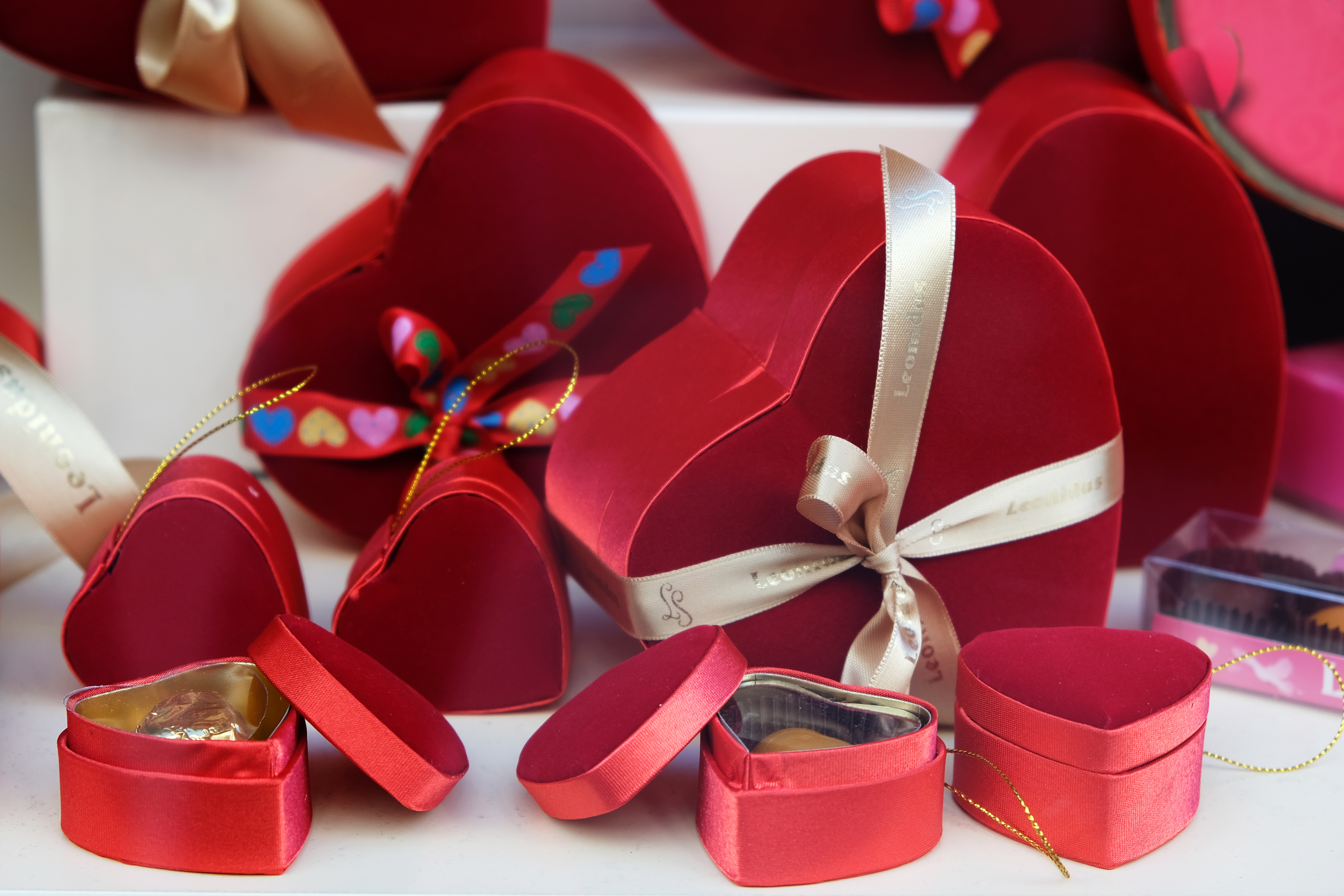
Valentine's Day

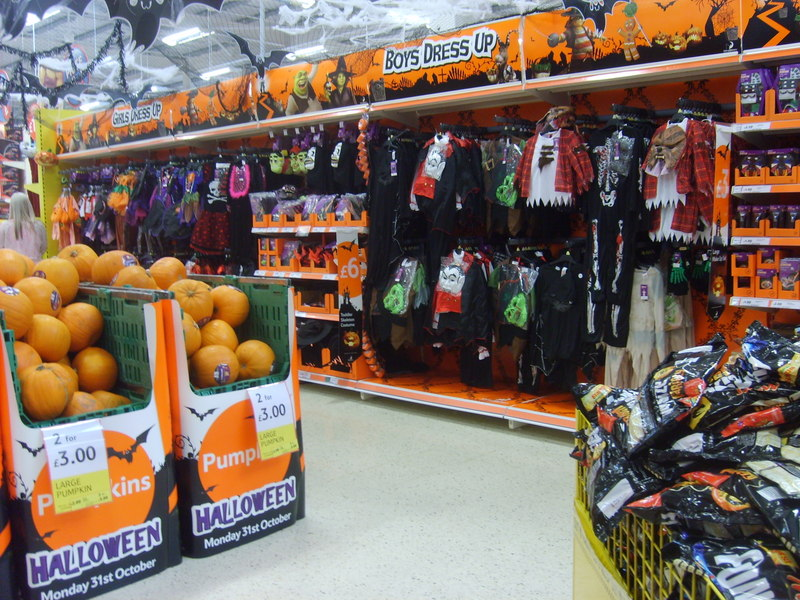
Halloween

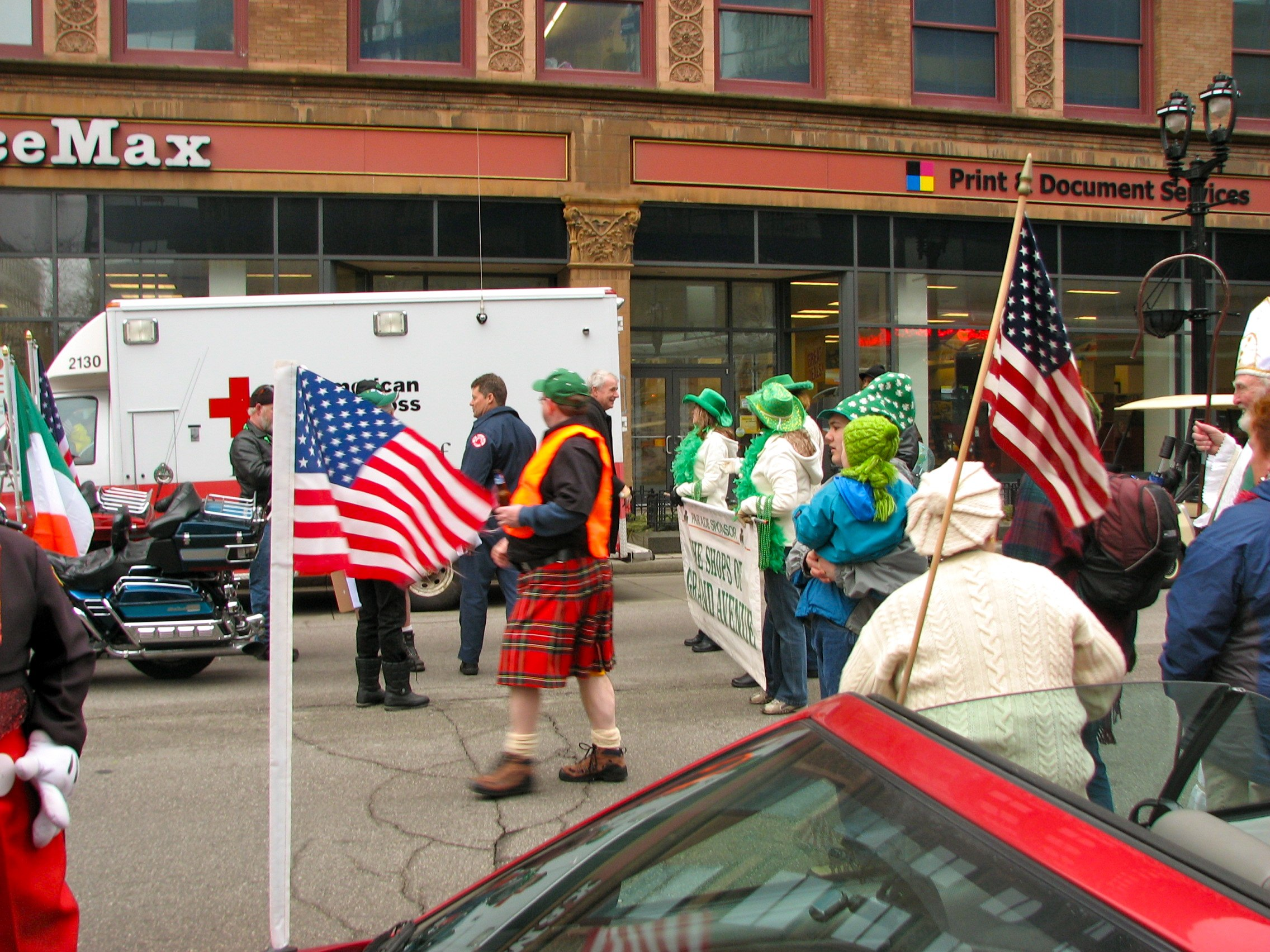
St. Patrick's day

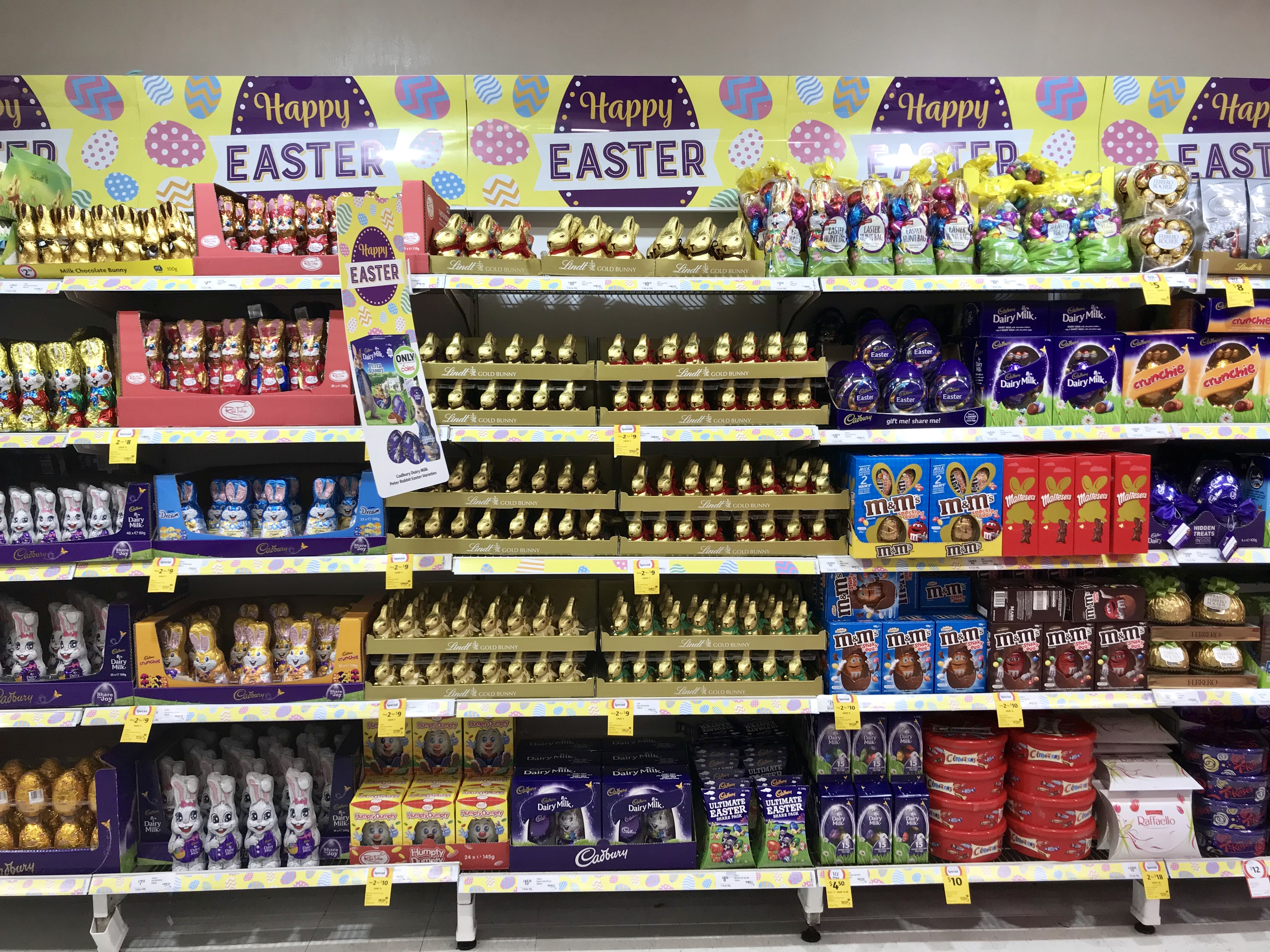
Easter

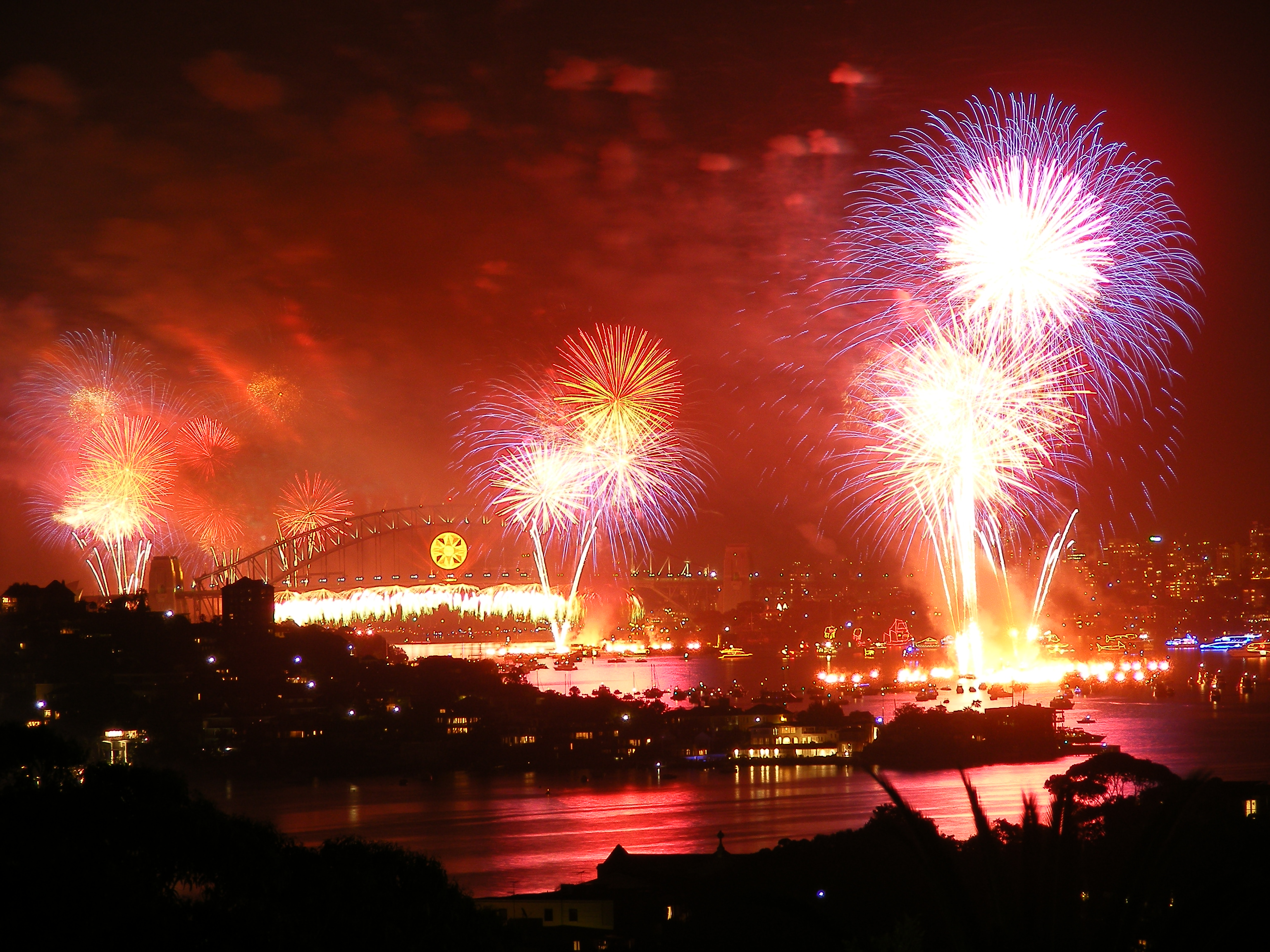
New Year's Eve

=== Indigenous cultures ===
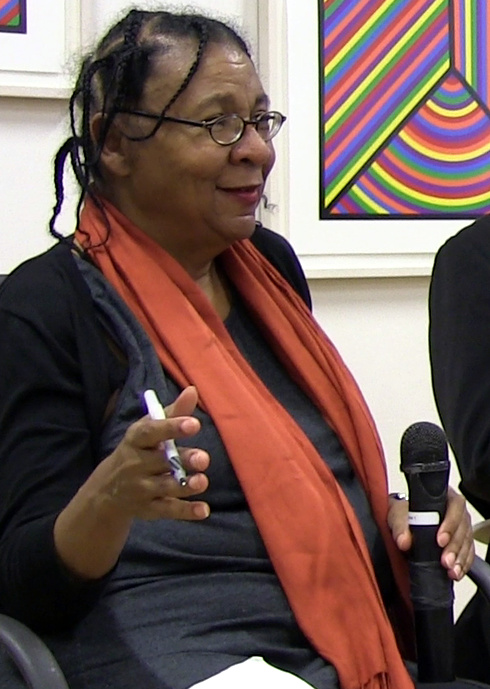
Bell Hooks, educator and social critic.

American author and feminist Bell Hooks described the cultural commodification of race and difference as the dominant culture "eating the other". To Hooks, cultural expressions of Otherness, even revolutionary ones, are sold to the dominant culture for their enjoyment, with any messages of social change being marketed not for their messages but used as a mechanism for the dominant ones to acquire a piece of the "primitive". Any interests in past historical culture almost always have a modern twist. According to Mariana Torgovnick:

What is clear now is that the West's fascination with the primitive has to do with its own crises in identity, with its own need to clearly demarcate subject and object even while flirting with other ways of experiencing the universe.

Hooks states that marginalized groups are seduced by this concept because of "the promise of recognition and reconciliation".

When the dominant culture demands that the Other be offered as sign that progressive political change is taking place, that the American Dream can indeed be inclusive of difference, it invites a resurgence of essentialist cultural nationalism.

Commodification of indigenous cultures refers to "areas in the life of a community which prior to its penetration by tourism have not been within the domain of economic relations regulated by criteria of market exchange" (Cohen 1988, 372). An example of this type of cultural commodification can be described through viewing the perspective of Hawaiian cultural change since the 1950s. The Hawaiian lūʻau was once a traditional party reserved for community members and local people, but through the rise of tourism, this tradition has lost part of its cultural meaning and is now mostly a "for profit" performance.

=== Love ===
Examples of profiting from love are the myriad The Bachelor television shows, and the increase in luxury hotels catering to singles during Valentine's Day weekends.

=== Media, Internet and online communities ===
Digital commodification occurs when, a business or corporation uses information from an online community without their knowledge, for profit. The commodification of information allows a higher authority to make money rather than a collaborative system of free thoughts. Corporations such as Google, Apple, Facebook, Netflix, and Amazon accelerate and concentrate the commodification of online communities. Digital tracking, like cookies, have further commodified the use of the internet, giving each click, view, or stream monetary value, even if it is an interaction with free content.

=== Public goods ===
Public goods are goods for which users cannot be barred from accessing or using them for failing to pay for them. However, such goods can also be commodified by value addition in the form of products or services or both. Public goods like air and water can be subjected to commodification.

=== Subcultures ===
Various subcultures have been argued to as having become commodified, for example the goth subculture, the biker subculture, the tattoo subculture, the witchcraft subculture, and others.

=== Tourism ===
Tourism has been analyzed in the context of commodification as a process of transforming local cultures and heritage into marketable goods. The commodification of tourism removes local culture from the foreground, replacing it with profitability from non-residents. This may be in the form of entertainment, souvenirs, food markets, or others. Tourism leads, in part, to the commodification of indigenous cultures as people return from visits with partial ideas and representations of the culture.

== See also ==
- Big data
- Commercialization
- Commercialization of love
- Commodification of animals
- Commodification of nature
- Decommodification
- Deregulation
- Exchange value
- Human commodity auctions
- Privatization
- Value-form
- Globalization

== Bibliography ==
- Farah, Paolo Davide, Tremolada Riccardo, Desirability of Commodification of Intangible Cultural Heritage: The Unsatisfying Role of IPRs, in TRANSNATIONAL DISPUTE MANAGEMENT, Special Issues "The New Frontiers of Cultural Law: Intangible Heritage Disputes", Volume 11, Issue 2, March 2014, ISSN 1875-4120 Available at SSRN.com
- Farah, Paolo Davide, Tremolada Riccardo, Intellectual Property Rights, Human Rights and Intangible Cultural Heritage, Journal of Intellectual Property Law, Issue 2, Part I, June 2014, ISSN 0035-614X, Giuffre, pp. 21–47. Available at SSRN.com
- Schimank, Uwe and Volkmann, Ute (ed.): The Marketization of Society: Economizing the Non-Economic. Bremen: Research Cluster "Welfare Societies", 2012.
