= Eva Illouz =

French-Israeli sociologist (born 1961)

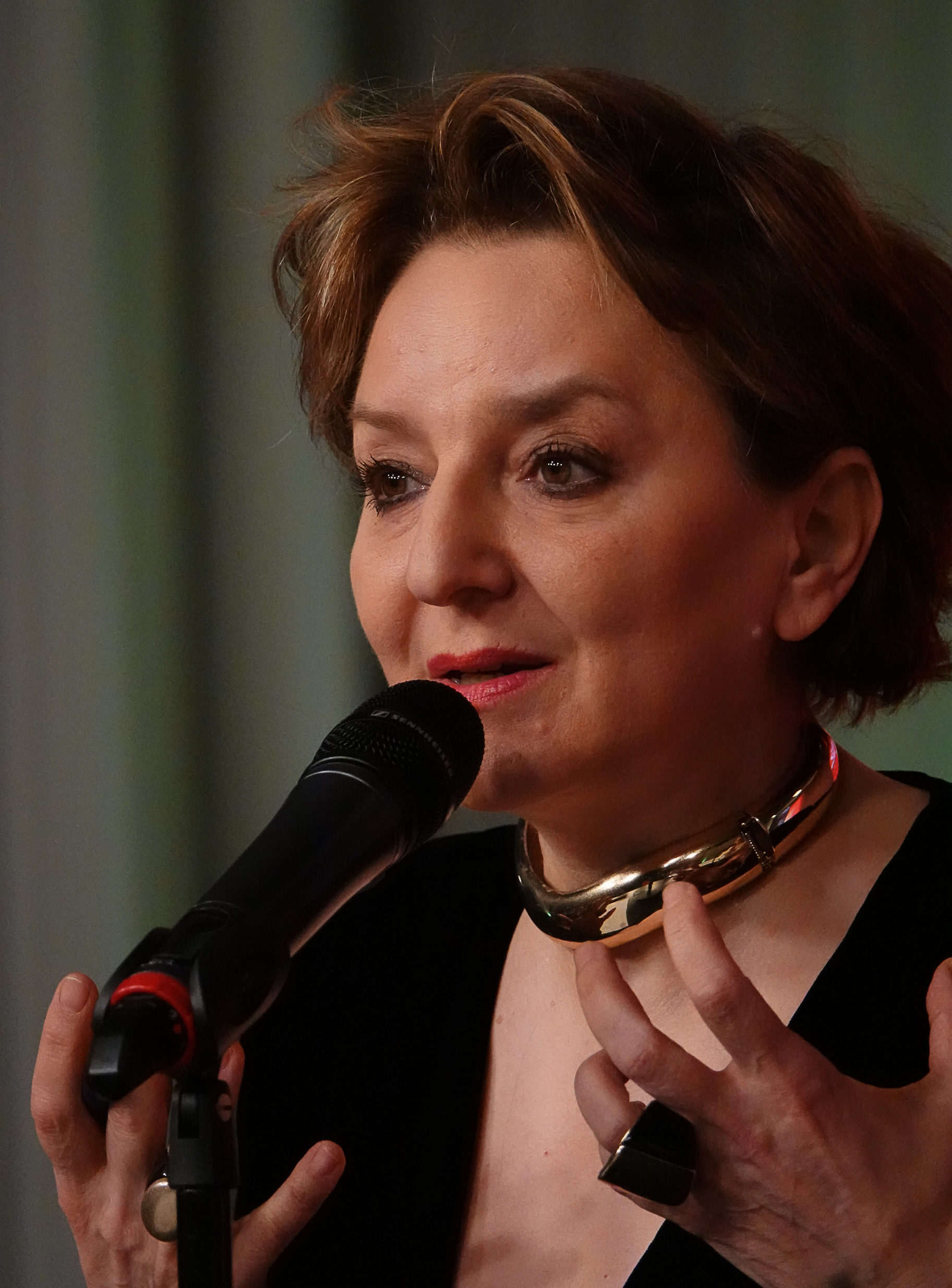
- Eva Illouz in 2025
- Born: Eva Illouz; 30 April 1961 (age 65); Fes, Morocco

Academic background
- Education: Paris-Nanterre University; Hebrew University of Jerusalem; University of Pennsylvania

Academic work
- Discipline: Sociology
- Institutions: Hebrew University of Jerusalem; School for Advanced Studies in the Social Sciences
- Notable works: Consuming the Romantic Utopia: Love and the Cultural Contradictions of Capitalism (1997); Oprah Winfrey and the Glamour of Misery: An Essay on Popular Culture (2003)

Eva Illouz (Arabic: إيفا اللوز; Hebrew: אווה אילוז; born April 30, 1961) is a French-Israeli Sociologist whose work examines the relationships between capitalism, culture, emotions, and intimate life. She is a professor emerita at the Hebrew University of Jerusalem and a Directrice d'études at the École des hautes études en sciences sociales (EHESS) in Paris.

Her research has explored romantic love, consumer culture, the sociology of emotions, popular media, and the psychological culture of modern societies, with particular attention to the ways in which economic and cultural institutions shape emotional experience. Illouz was the first woman to serve as president of the Bezalel Academy of Arts and Design, serving from 2012 to 2015. Her work has received numerous international distinctions, including the EMET Prize in 2018, the Chevalier de la Légion d'honneur in 2018, the Anneliese Maier International Award for Excellence in Research in 2013, and the Frank Schirrmacher Prize in 2024.

== Early life and education ==
Eva Illouz was born in Fes, Morocco, and moved to France at the age of ten with her parents.

She received a B.A. in sociology, communication and literature in Paris, an M.A. in literature in Paris, an M.A. in communication from the Hebrew University, and received her PhD in communications and cultural studies at the Annenberg School for Communication of the University of Pennsylvania in 1991. Her mentor was Prof. Larry Gross.

She has served as a visiting professor at Northwestern University, Princeton University, and as a fellow at the Institute for Advanced Study in Berlin (Wissenschaftskolleg zu Berlin). Illouz was one of the founders of the Program for Cultural Studies at the Hebrew University. In 2006, Illouz joined the Center for the Study of Rationality. In 2012 she was named first woman president of the Bezalel Academy of Art and Design in which she stayed until 2015.

== Academic career ==
In 2022, Illouz was ranked as the eighth most influential woman in sociology worldwide.

She taught at Tel Aviv University until 2000. In 2006, she joined Hebrew University's Center for the Study of Rationality. She has held the Rose Isaac Chair in Sociology at the Hebrew University of Jerusalem. Since 2015, she is Directrice d'Etudes at the École des Hautes Études en Sciences Sociales in Paris.

In 2008 she was a fellow at the Berlin Institute for Advanced Study. From 2012 until 2015 she was the first woman president of Bezalel Academy of Art and Design. In 2016, Illouz was the Hedi Fritz Niggli Guest Professor at Zürich University. In 2018, she was a member fellow at the Institute for Advanced Study at Princeton. In 2019, she was the Niklas Luhmann Guest Professor in Bielefeld.

Eva Illouz is fluent in Hebrew, French and English.

She is a regular contributor to Ha'aretz, Le Monde, Die Zeit, Süddeutsche Zeitung, and der Freitag.

== Awards and recognition ==
- Her book Consuming the Romantic Utopia won Honorable Mention for the Best Book Award at the American Sociological Association, 2000 (emotions section).
- Her book Oprah Winfrey and the Glamour of Misery won the Best Book Award, American Sociological Association, 2005 Culture Section.
- In 2004, Illouz received the Outstanding research award of the Hebrew University of Jerusalem.
- In the same year, Illouz delivered the Adorno lectures Cold Intimacies: The Making of Emotional Capitalism at the Institute for Social Research in Frankfurt.
- In 2009, the German newspaper Die Zeit chose her as one of the 12 thinkers most likely to "change the thought of tomorrow".
- In 2013, she received the Annaliese Meier International Award for Excellence in Research from the Alexander von Humboldt Foundation.
- Her book Why Love Hurts won the best book award of the Alpine Philosophy Society in France. It is also the recipient of the 2014 Outstanding Recent Contribution Award (Sociology of Emotions section) from the American Sociological Association.
- In 2018, Illouz received the E.M.E.T award [1], the highest scientific distinction in Israel.
- In July 2018, she was also made Chevalier de la Légion d'honneur [2] in France.
- In 2021 Illouz received the Albertus Magnus award from the University of Cologne.
- In 2024, Illouz was awarded the Frank Schirrmacher Prize in "recognition of outstanding contributions to our understanding of current events".
- In 2024, Illouz was also awarded the Aby Warburg Prize for outstanding achievements in humanities and social sciences.
- In 2025, the Israel Prize committee selected Illouz for the 2025 Israel Prize in Sociology. However, education minister Yoav Kisch declared that he would not allow this award to be given to Illouz, citing a 2021 petition to the International Criminal Court that she had signed, which stated that Israel should not be allowed to investigate its own alleged war crimes. Following this, the Institute for Israeli Thought awarded Illouz the Democratic Israel Prize, and the Hebrew University awarded her a lifetime achievement award.
- In 2025, Illouz was selected to give the prestigious Schiller Lecture in Marbach (Schillerrede), and the annual Willy Brandt speech at the Bundeskanzler Willy Brandt Stiftung in Lübeck.
- In August 2026, Illouz delivered the leçon inaugurale (inaugural lecture) for incoming first-year students at Sciences Po's Paris campus. The lecture, delivered on 25 August, addressed the responsibility of intellectuals.

== Research topics ==
Illouz's research is at the junction of the sociology of emotions, of culture and of capitalism. In her latest works she has increasingly focused on the impact of capitalism on sexuality and emotions.

=== Impact of capitalism on emotions, subjectivity, and gender relations ===
One dominant theme in Illouz's research concerns the ways in which capitalism has transformed emotional patterns, in the realms of both consumption and production.

Her first book, Consuming the Romantic Utopia, addresses the commodification of romance and the romanticization of commodities. Looking at a wide sample of movies and advertising images in women's magazines of the 1930s, advertising and cinematic culture presented commodities as the vector for emotional experiences and particularly the experience of romance. The second process was that of the commodification of romance, the process by which the 19th-century practice of calling on a woman, that is going to her home, was replaced by dating: going out and consuming the increasingly powerful industries of leisure. Romantic encounters moved from the home to the sphere of consumer leisure with the result that the search for romantic love was made into a vector for the consumption of leisure goods produced by expanding industries of leisure.

In her book Why Love Hurts, she centers on the notion of choice. The book makes the somewhat counter-intuitive claim that one of the most fruitful ways to understand the transformation of love in modernity is through the category of choice. Illouz views choice as the defining cultural hallmark of modernity because in the economic and political arenas, choice embodies the two faculties that justify the exercise of freedom, namely rationality and autonomy. She extends this insight to the emotional realm and studies the various mechanisms through which in modernity choice of a mate have changed and have transformed the emotions active in the will of partners who meet in a market situation. In this sense, choice is one of the most powerful cultural and institutional vectors helping us understand modern individualism. Given that choice is intrinsic to modern individuality, how and why people choose – or not – to enter a relationship is crucial to understanding love as an emotion and a relationship.

=== Sociological critique of psychology and self-help culture ===
Illouz argues that psychology has been central to the constitution of modern identity and to modern emotional life: from the 1920s to the 1960s clinical psychologists became an extraordinarily dominant social group as they entered the army, the corporation, the school, the state, social services, the media, child rearing, sexuality, marriage, church pastoral care. In all of these realms, psychology established itself as the ultimate authority in matters of human distress by offering techniques to transform and overcome that distress. Psychologists of all persuasions have provided the main narrative of self-development for the 20th century. The psychological persuasion has transformed what was classified as a moral problem into a disease and may thus be understood as part and parcel of the broader phenomenon of the medicalization of social life. What is common to theme 1 and theme 2 is that both love and psychological health constitute utopias of happiness for the modern self, that both are mediated through consumption and that both constitute horizons to which the modern self aspires. In that sense, one overarching theme of her work can be called the utopia of happiness and its interaction with the utopia of consumption.

=== Emotions, modernity, and social institutions ===
A central concern of Illouz's more recent work is the social production of emotions and the relationship between inner life and social institutions. Rather than treating emotions primarily as private psychological experiences, she examines how they are shaped by institutions, cultural norms, economic structures, and changing forms of social organization. In Emotional Capitalism and Cold Intimacies, she analyzes the intersection of economic and emotional life; in The End of Love, she examines how changing social conditions transform intimacy, commitment, and the experience of relationships. Her more recent work expands this perspective beyond love and capitalism to a wider range of emotions and institutions. In Explosive Emotions: How Modern Society Shapes What We Feel, she examines emotions including hope, disappointment, envy, resentment, anger, fear, anxiety, shame, nostalgia, jealousy, and love, arguing that they are embedded in institutions such as corporations, markets, universities, nation-states, marriage, and sexuality. Emotions therefore function not only as experiences of individuals but also as ways in which social structures are reproduced within subjective life.

=== Politics, technology, and contemporary emotional life ===
In her more recent research, Illouz has extended her sociology of emotions to political life and technological change. In The Emotional Life of Populism: How Fear, Disgust, Resentment, and Love Undermine Democracy, she examines how emotions are mobilized by populist politics and how fear, disgust, resentment, and love can affect democratic life. Her later work connects these political transformations to broader changes associated with technology and techno-capitalism. In Explosive Emotions: How Modern Society Shapes What We Feel, she links contemporary emotions such as anger, disappointment, envy, fear, and nostalgia to inequality, political disaffection, populism, technological change, and the transformation of modern institutions.

== Published works ==
Illouz is the author of many books, some of which have been translated into 25 languages, and of numerous articles.

- 1997: Consuming the Romantic Utopia: Love and the Cultural Contradictions of Capitalism. Berkeley: University of California Press. (371 pp.). (Trad. esp.: El consumo de la utopía romántica, Buenos Aires/Madrid, Katz editores S.A, 2009, ISBN 978-84-96859-53-1)
- 2002: The Culture of Capitalism (in Hebrew). Israel University Broadcast (110 pp.).
- 2003: Oprah Winfrey and the Glamour of Misery: An Essay on Popular Culture. Columbia University Press (300 pp.) ISBN 0231118120
- 2007: Cold Intimacies: The Making of Emotional Capitalism. Polity Press. London. (Trad. esp.: Intimidades congeladas, Buenos Aires/Madrid, Katz editores S.A, 2007, ISBN 978-84-96859-17-3)
- 2008: Saving the Modern Soul: Therapy, Emotions, and the Culture of Self-Help, The University of California Press. ISBN 9780520253735
- 2011: Who needs democracy anyway?, Haaretz.
- 2011: Neutrality is political, Haaretz.
- 2011: A collapse of trust, Haaretz.
- 2012: Why Love Hurts: A Sociological Explanation, Polity. ISBN 9780745661520 (German translation by Michael Adrian: Warum Liebe weh tut, Suhrkamp Verlag, Berlin ISBN 9783518296578).
- 2014: Hard Core Romance: Fifty Shades of Grey, Best Sellers and Society, University of Chicago Press. ISBN 9780226153698 (in German: Die neue Liebesordnung: Frauen, Männer und Shades of Grey. Suhrkamp Verlag, Berlin 2013. ISBN 9783518064870).
- 2015: Israel – Sociological Essays, Suhrkamp Verlag, Berlin. ISBN 9783518126837.
- 2018: Emotions as Commodities: How Commodities Became Authentic. Routledge ISBN 978-1138628236 (German translation by Michael Adrian: Wa(h)re Gefühle – Authentizität im Konsumkapitalismus, foreword by Axel Honneth, Suhrkamp Verlag, Berlin. ISBN 9783518298084).
- 2018: Unloving: A Sociology of Negative Relations. Oxford University Press (German translation by Michael Adrian: Warum Liebe endet – Eine Soziologie negativer Beziehungen, Suhrkamp Verlag, Berlin 2020. ISBN 9783518587232).
- 2018: Happycracy: How the Industry of Happiness controls our lives. Polity Press (French translation by Frédéric Joly: Happycratie: Comment l’Industrie du Bonheur contrôle notre vie, Premier Parallèle Editeur, Paris. ISBN 9791094841761).
- 2023: The Emotional Life of Populism: How Fear, Disgust, Resentment, and Love Undermine Democracy. Polity Press.
- 2025: October 8th: a genealogy of virtuous hatred, published in French.
- 2025: La Civilisation des émotions, published in French.
- 2025: Explosive Emotions: How Modern Society Shapes What We Feel. First published in German in 2024, titled "Explosive Moderne".
- 2026: Emotional Technologies: How Techno-Capitalism Exploits Our Subjectivity. With Jonas Ferdinand. Cambridge: Polity, 2026. ISBN 978-1-5095-7520-6.
- 2026: Über die Ursprünge des neuen Antisemitismus [On the Origins of the New Antisemitism]. Translated by Ulrike Bischoff and Michael Bischoff. Berlin: Suhrkamp Verlag, forthcoming October 27, 2026. ISBN 978-3-518-47573-7.

== See also ==
- Women in Israel
- History of emotions
- Wissenschaftskolleg zu Berlin
