= The Managed Heart =

1983 book by Arlie Russell Hochschild

The Managed Heart: Commercialization of Human Feeling
- First edition
- Author: Arlie Russell Hochschild
- Language: English
- Genre: Nonfiction social science
- Publisher: The University of California Press
- Publication date: 1983, with reissues in 2003 and 2012
- Publication place: United States
- Media type: Print (Hardback & Paperback)
- Pages: 307
- ISBN: 9780520272941 (2012 release)

The Managed Heart: Commercialization of Human Feeling, is a book by Arlie Russell Hochschild that was first published in 1983. In the book, Hochschild documents how social situations influence emotions through the experiences of flight attendants, servers, and bill collectors. Hochschild coined the need at work for surface acting as emotional labor.

A 20th Anniversary edition, with a new afterword added by the author, was published in 2003. The book was also reissued in 2012 with a new preface. The book has been translated into German (Campus Press), Chinese (Laureate Books, Taipei, Taiwan), Japanese (Sekai Shisosha, Kyoto, Japan), Polish (Polish Scientific Publishers PWN), and French (La Découverte, 2017). Hochschild's text is seminal, with scholars like Sarah J. Tracy and Stephen Fineman having expanded on her concept of emotional labor.

== Theoretical background ==
The book is an expansion on theoretical concepts that Hochschild first described in 1979. Using Goffman's dramaturgical theory, she describes how different social situations have different emotional norms.

Surface acting involves simply pretending to feel what one does not, primarily through body language, facial expressions, and tone of voice. These rules vary based on the social group one is a part of. When a person's feelings do not fit the norms of the situation, people engage in practices to bring them into agreement through a combination of cognitive, bodily, or expressive techniques.

Hochschild's social theory of emotion also drew on the work of C. Wright Mills.

== Emotional labor ==
Hochschild coined these workplace requirements for surface acting as emotional labor.

Hochschild's primary example describes the emotional norms in the workplace of flight attendants. In order to sell passengers the experience of good customer service, flight attendants are expected to remain calm and cheerful.

In contrast to the pleasant demeanor expected of flight attendants, the occupational norms for bill collectors for example were to maintain a suspicious view of debtors in order to get them to pay more effectively. Collectors are pushed to deflate the debtor's status through increasing their own, using a variety of cognitive and verbal ways to trick debtors or withhold empathy from them. Collectors were expected to do this even if they did not truly side with the company they were collecting payment on behalf of.

Hochschild also explains how emotional labor is performed disproportionately by women who need to hide their feelings more in social and work settings. Emotional labor is also closely related to the more modern concept of "mental load".

== Reception and influence ==
Hochschild's book constituted a major development in symbolic interactionism and the sociology of emotions, having influenced the work of scholars such as Nancy Whittier and Kari Norgaard.

Daniel Goleman made the link between the concept of emotional intelligence emerging prominently when emotional labour, as described by Hochschild in The Managed Heart, became central to economic productivity.

== Awards and honors ==
In 1983, the book received the Charles Cooley Award, given by the American Sociological Association. It also received an honorable mention for the C. Wright Mills Award.
