= Strangers in Their Own Land =

2016 book by Arlie Russell Hochschild

Strangers in Their Own Land: Anger and Mourning on the American Right
- First edition
- Author: Arlie Russell Hochschild
- Language: English
- Subject: Tea Party movement, Louisiana
- Publisher: The New Press
- Publication date: 2016
- Awards: National Book Award Finalist
- ISBN: 978-1-62097-225-0 (Hardcover)

Strangers in Their Own Land: Anger and Mourning on the American Right is a 2016 book by sociologist Arlie Russell Hochschild. The book sets out to explain the worldview of supporters of the Tea Party movement in Louisiana.

== Summary ==
Hochschild's book was written after speaking to focus groups and interviewing Tea Party supporters. She focuses her efforts in Lake Charles, Louisiana, in Calcasieu Parish. The bayou area has a high concentration of petrochemical plants as well as a high level of pollution in its waterways. Hochschild wanted to understand why there was little support for environmental regulation in this area, despite what would seem to be the self-interest of its residents. Hochschild's research led her to focus on the cultural values that led people to oppose government regulation. Prominent among these were their attitudes about taxes, their religious convictions, and challenges to their honor.

The core of the book is Hochschild's attempt to distill the worldview of Tea Party supporters, who formed part of the same constituency that heavily backed Donald Trump in the 2016 U.S. presidential election. According to Hochschild, Tea Party supporters have reacted against the changing face of America in the last few decades. They perceive a situation where women, immigrants, and racial minorities have been "cutting in line" to achieve the American Dream. They also feel as though some government officials (such as President Barack Obama) have been waving these same groups to the front of the line through affirmative action programs and other kinds of support. As a result of these perceptions, the older, largely white, and disproportionately male supporters of the Tea Party increasingly feel, as Hochschild's title indicates, like strangers in their own land.

== Reception ==
- Finalist for the 2016 National Book Award for Nonfiction. The citation notes, "She writes unflinchingly of deep reasons people act against their apparent self-interest and makes the unlikely case that even in 2016 mutual compassion and understanding between the right and the left are possible."
- Selected by The New York Times as one of "6 Books to Understand Trump's Win" and it has been a New York Times Best Seller. It has been reviewed by Jason DeParle in the New York Times Book Review, by David Brooks in his July 4, 2017 New York Times op-ed, by Jedediah Purdy in The New Republic, by Nathaniel Rich in The New York Review of Books, by Gabriel Thompson in Newsday and by Ralph Benko in Forbes.
