= The Outsourced Self =

The Outsourced Self: Intimate Life in Market Times
- First edition
- Author: Arlie Russell Hochschild
- Language: English
- Genre: Nonfiction social science
- Publisher: Metropolitan Books
- Publication date: 2012
- Publication place: United States
- Media type: Print
- ISBN: 9780805088892

The Outsourced Self: Intimate Life in Market Times, by Arlie Russell Hochschild, was published in 2012. It focuses on the "emotional terms of engagement" individuals develop as they increasingly outsource tasks associated with intimate life. These range from for-pay internet dating, long-distance elder care and take-out dinners to "rent-a-friends" and global commercial surrogacy.
