= Arlie Russell Hochschild =

American professor of sociology (born 1940)

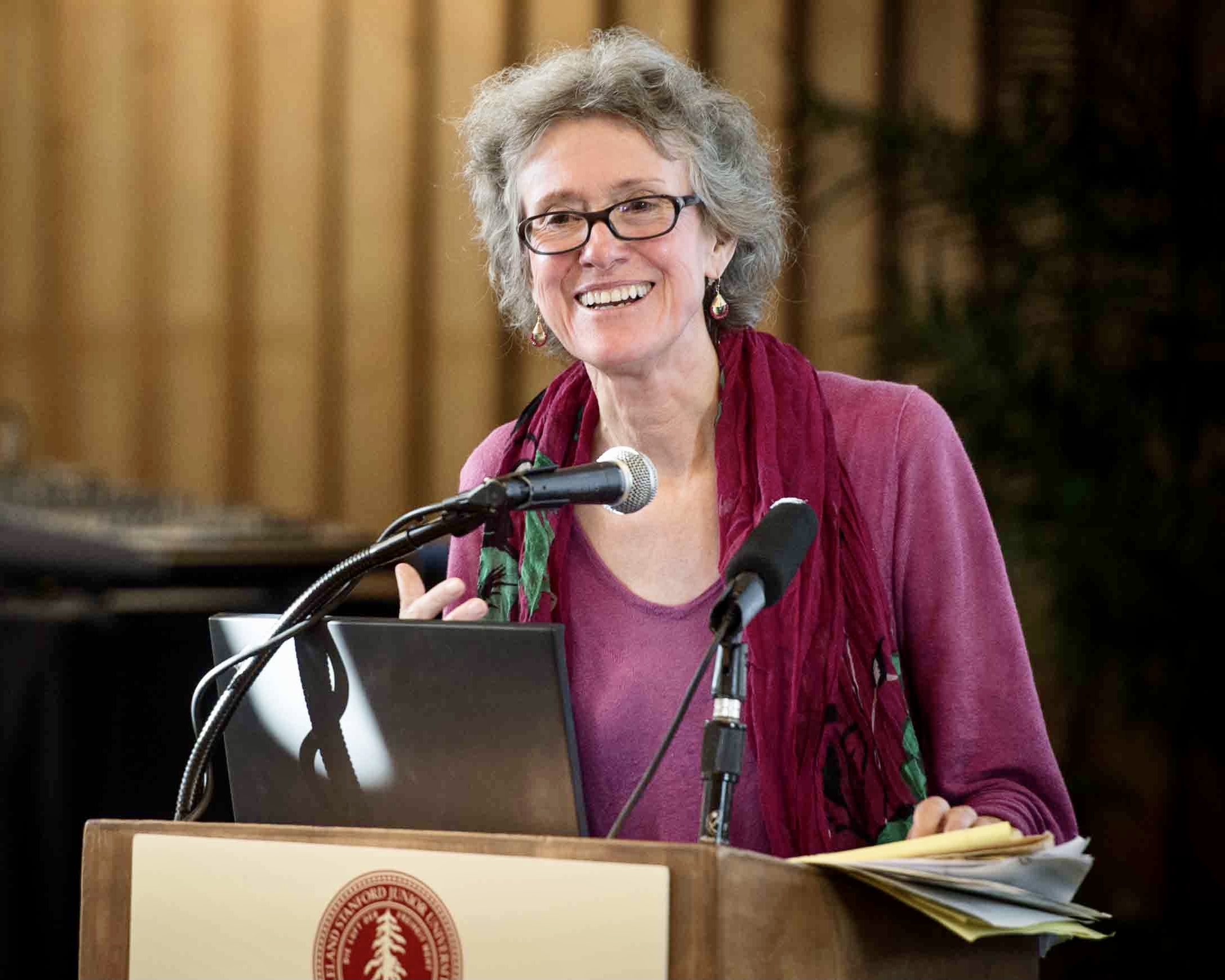
- Hochschild in 2017
- Born: Arlie Russell; January 15, 1940 (age 86); Boston, Massachusetts, U.S.
- Education: Swarthmore College (BA); University of California, Berkeley (MA, PhD)
- Known for: Emotional labor, gender division of labor in the household
- Spouse: Adam Hochschild
- Children: 2
- Scientific career
- Fields: Social psychology, sociology of emotions, gender and politics
- Workplaces: University of California-Berkeley

Arlie Russell Hochschild (/ˈhoʊkʃɪld/; born January 15, 1940) is an American professor emerita of sociology at the University of California, Berkeley and writer. Hochschild has long focused on the human emotions that underlie moral beliefs, practices, and social life generally.

She is the author of ten books, including Stolen Pride: Loss, Shame, and the Rise of the Right (The New Press, September 10, 2024), which explores life in a struggling Appalachian town, and focuses on the appeal of right wing populism – and "emotional capture" – to those who have suffered loss of jobs, respect and hope. The book was chosen by Barack Obama as one of his ten "favorite books of 2024." Since the book was published, Hochschild has continued to check in with her informants to see how they are responding to the Trump presidency. She has also hosted a roundtable discussion among these diverse informants to promote productive engagement across the political divide. Stolen Pride is a follow-up to her last book, Strangers in Their Own Land: Anger and Mourning on the American Right, a New York Times Bestseller and finalist for the National Book Award. Journalist Derek Thompson described it as "a Rosetta stone" for understanding the rise of Donald Trump.

In these and other books, she continues the sociological tradition of C. Wright Mills by drawing links between private troubles and public issues. In drawing this link, she has tried to illuminate the ways we recognize, attend to, appraise, evoke, and suppress – that is to say, manage – emotion. She has applied this focus to the family, to work, and to political life. Her works have been translated into 17 languages. She is also the author of a children's book titled Coleen The Question Girl, illustrated by Gail Ashby.

== Biography ==
=== Early life and family background ===
Arlie Hochschild was born Arlie Russell in Boston, Massachusetts, the daughter of Ruth Alene (Libbey) and Francis Henry Russell, a diplomat who served in Israel, New Zealand, Ghana, and Tunisia. In her 2016 book, Strangers in Their Own Land, Hochschild says that her first experiences reaching out and getting to know people different from her stem from her own childhood idea that she was "daddy's helper" (probably not an idea he shared, she later reflects).

She married Adam Hochschild in 1965 and they have two sons, David and Gabriel. In 1964, she and Adam were civil rights workers in Vicksburg, Mississippi.

=== Education and academic career ===
Hochschild graduated from Swarthmore College in 1962 with a major in International Relations. She earned her MA (1965) and PhD (1969) from the University of California, Berkeley, whose faculty she joined after teaching at the University of California, Santa Cruz from 1969 to 1971.

== Areas of research ==
Using in-depth interviews and observation, Hochschild's research has taken her into various social worlds. She has written about residents in a low-income housing project for the elderly (The Unexpected Community), flight attendants and bill collectors who perform "emotional labor" (The Managed Heart), working parents struggling to divide housework and childcare (The Second Shift), corporate employees dealing with a culture of workaholism (The Time Bind). She has also interviewed child and eldercare workers, internet-dating assistants, wedding planners (The Outsourced Self) and Filipina nannies who've left their children behind to care for those of American families (Global Woman). Her 2013 So How's the Family and Other Essays is a collection that includes essays on emotional labor – when do we enjoy it and when not? – empathy, and personal strategies for trying to have fun and “make meaning” in a life with little family time.

Her last two research projects have focused on the rise of the political right. Strangers in Their Own Land is based on five years of ethnographic research among Louisiana supporters of the Tea Party. Why, she asks, do residents of the nation's second poorest state vote for candidates who resist federal help? Why, in a highly polluted state, do voters prefer politicians reluctant to regulate polluting industries? Her search for answers led her to the concept of the "deep story.” The book was a National Book Award finalist, as well as one of the top ten best non-fiction books of the decade by the Boston Public Library.

In Stolen Pride: Loss, Shame, and the Rise of the Right, she locates herself in the nation's whitest and second poorest congressional district. Coal jobs had gone. A drug crisis had arrived. And in 2017, a white nationalist march was coming to town – a rehearsal, as it turned out, for the Unite the Right march soon to take place in Charlottesville, Virginia. Once at the political center of the country, the district voted 80% for Donald Trump in both 2016 and 2020. Hochschild explores a culture of pride and struggle with unwarranted shame, and finds in this a lens through which to see politics in America today, and in many other times and places.

=== Emotion in social life: feeling rules and emotional labor ===
Hochschild proposes that human emotions – joy, sadness, anger, elation, jealousy, envy, despair – are partly social. Each culture, she argues, provides its members with prototypes of feeling which, like the different keys on a piano, attune us to different inner notes. She provides an example of the Tahitians, who have one word, "sick," for what in other cultures might correspond to envy, depression, grief, or sadness. Culture guides the act of recognizing a feeling by proposing what's possible for us to feel. In The Managed Heart, Hochschild cites the Czech novelist Milan Kundera, who writes that the Czech word "litost" refers to an indefinable longing, mixed with remorse and grief – a constellation of feelings with no equivalent in any other language. It is not that non-Czechs never feel litost, she notes; it is that they are not, in the same way, invited to lift out and affirm the feeling.

We don't simply feel what we feel, Hochschild suggests. We "try to" feel the way we wish to or think we should feel based on socially derived feeling rules. And we do this through emotional labor. For example, in The Managed Heart, Hochschild writes of how flight attendants are trained to control passengers' feelings during times of turbulence and dangerous situations while suppressing their own fear or anxiety. Bill collectors, as well, are often trained to imagine debtors as lazy or dishonest, so they can feel suspicious and intimidating. As the number of service jobs grows, so too do different forms of emotional labor. In the era of COVID-19, she argues, many front-line workers do the emotional labor of suppressing heightened anxieties about their own health and that of their families while dealing with the fear, anxiety and sometimes hostility of the public.

Emotional labor has gone global, she argues. In her essay, "Love and Gold," in Global Woman she describes immigrant care workers who leave their children and elderly back in the Philippines, Mexico or elsewhere in the global South, to take paid jobs caring for the young and elderly in families in the affluent North. Such jobs call on workers to manage grief and anguish vis-a-vis their own long-unseen children, spouses, and elderly parents, even as they try to feel – and genuinely do feel – warm attachment to the children and elders they daily care for in the North. Hochschild describes such a pattern as a global care chain.

=== Work and family ===
In other books, Hochschild applies her perspective on emotion to the American family. In The Second Shift, she argues that the family has been stuck in a "stalled revolution." Most mothers work for pay outside the home; that is the revolution. But the jobs they have and the men they come home to haven't changed as rapidly or deeply as she has; that is the stall. Hochschild traces links between a couple's division of labor and their underlying "economy of gratitude." Who, she asks, is grateful to whom, and for what?

In The Time Bind, Hochschild studied working parents at a Fortune 500 company dealing with an important contradiction. On one hand, nearly everyone she talked to told her that "my family comes first." However, when she asked informants "Where do you get help when you need it?" or "Where are you most rewarded for what you do, work or home?" for some 20 percent the answer was "at work." For them, "family becomes like work and work takes on the feel and tone of the family."

In an interview with the Journal of Consumer Culture, Hochschild describes how capitalism plays a role in one's "imaginary self" – the self we would be if only we had time.

=== Disengagement theory ===
In her earlier work, Hochschild critiqued the disengagement theory of aging. According to that theory, inevitably and universally, through disengagement, the individual experiences a social death before they experience physical death. But in the low-income housing project she studied for her PhD Dissertation and later published as The Unexpected Community, she discovered among the lively group of elderly residents a culture of continued engagement. When they died, it seemed, it was "with their boots on." Across the world, she suggests, individuals differ in their ideals of aging, in the feeling rules they apply to life, and may even differ in the very experience of death.

== Honors ==
Hochschild has received honorary degrees from Harvard University (2021), the University of Lausanne, Switzerland (2018), Westminster College, Pennsylvania (2018), Mount St. Vincent University, Canada (2013), the University of Lapland, Finland (2012), Aalborg University, Denmark (2004), the University of Oslo, Norway (2000), and Swarthmore College (1993). She also received the Ulysses Medal from University College Dublin, Ireland (2015) the Helmholtz Medal from the Berlin Brandenburg Academy of Sciences and Humanities in 2024 and the Landshut Medal from the Hamburg Institute for Social Research, in 2025. She has also been inducted into the California Hall of Fame (2022).

== Bibliography ==
=== Books ===
- Hochschild, Arlie Russell (1973). The Unexpected Community. Prentice-Hall. ISBN 978-0-13-936385-6.
- The Managed Heart: Commercialization of Human Feeling. University of California Press. 1983. ISBN 978-0-520-05454-7.
- The Second Shift: Working Families and the Revolution at Home. Viking. 1989. ISBN 978-0-670-82463-2.
- The Time Bind: When Work Becomes Home and Home Becomes Work. Metropolitan Books. 1997. ISBN 978-0-8050-4471-3.
- The Commercialization of Intimate Life: Notes from Home and Work. University of California Press. 2003. ISBN 978-0-520-21488-0.
- —; Ehrenreich, Barbara, eds. (2003). Global Woman: Nannies, Maids, and Sex Workers in the New Economy. Metropolitan Books. ISBN 978-0-8050-7509-0.
- The Outsourced Self: Intimate Life in Market Times. Metropolitan Books. 2012. ISBN 978-0-8050-8889-2.
- So How's the Family? and Other Essays. University of California Press. 2013. ISBN 978-0-520-27228-6.
- —; Tronto, Joan; Gilligan, Carol (2013). Contre l'Indifférence Des Privilégiés: à Quoi Sert le Care (in French). Paris: Payot. ISBN 978-2-228-90877-1.
- Strangers in Their Own Land: Anger and Mourning on the American Right. The New Press. 2016. ISBN 978-1-62097-225-0.
- Hochschild, Arlie (July 15, 2016). Coleen - The Question Girl. Blurb. ISBN 978-1-367-45897-0.
- Coleen the Question Girl. London, UK: Invisible Spaces of Parenthood. 2016. ISBN 978-1-367-45897-0. OCLC 1090643724.
- Stolen Pride: Loss, Shame, and the Rise of the Right. The New Press. 2024. ISBN 978-1-62097-646-3.

== See also ==
- Commercialization of love
- Emotion work
- Emotional labor
- Time bind
- Feeling rules
