= The Time Bind =

The Time Bind: When Work Becomes Home and Home Becomes Work is a 1997 book by sociologist Arlie Russell Hochschild. The book refers to the blurring distinction between work and home social environments.

Hochschild found in her research that although most working parents, particularly mothers, said "family comes first", few of them considered adjusting their long working hours, even when their workplaces offered flextime, parental leave, remote work, or other "family friendly" policies. She concluded that the roles of home and work had reversed: work had become more attractive, offering a sense of belonging, while home had grown more stressful, becoming a dreaded place with too many demands.

== See also ==
- Double burden
- Work–family balance in the United States
- Work–family conflict
- Work–life balance
