= Sociology of emotions =

Branch of sociology

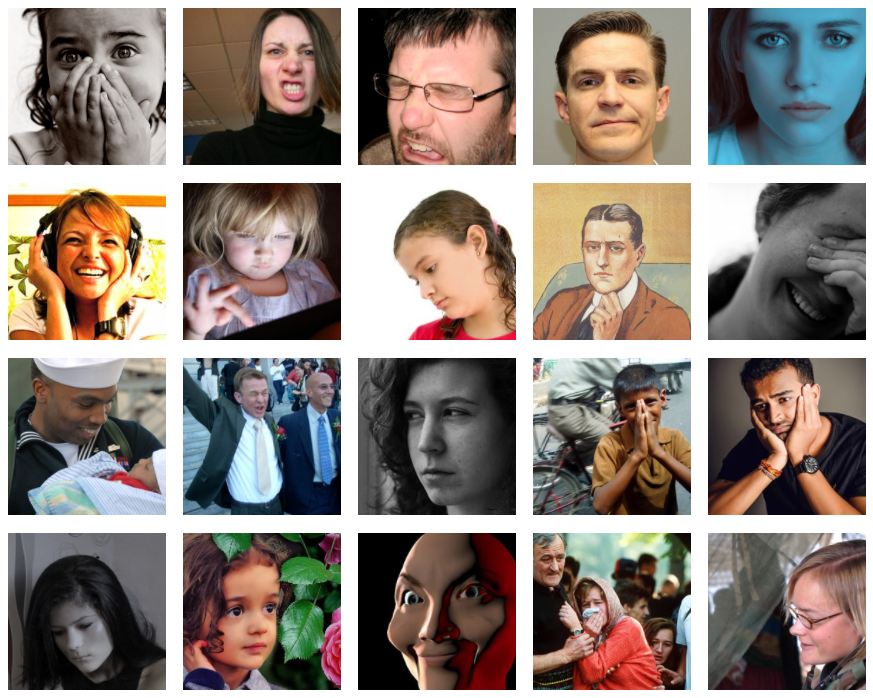

The Sociology of emotions applies a sociological lens to the topic of emotions. The discipline of Sociology, which falls within the social sciences, is focused on understanding both the mind and society, studying the dynamics of the self, interaction, social structure, and culture. While the topic of emotions can be found in early classic sociological theories, sociologists began a more systematic study of emotions in the 1970s when scholars in the discipline were particularly interested in how emotions influenced the self, how they shaped the flow of interactions, how people developed emotional attachments to social structures and cultural symbols, and how social structures and cultural symbols constrained the experience and expression of emotions. Sociologists have focused on how emotions are present in the creation of social structures and systems of cultural symbols, and how they can also play a role in deconstructing social structures and challenging cultural traditions. In this case, in order to understand the mind, affect and rational thought must be considered since humans find motivation among non-rational factors such as levels of emotional commitment to norms, values, and beliefs. Within sociology, emotions can be seen as social constructs that are fabricated by interaction and collaboration between human beings. Emotions are a part of the human experience, and they gain their meaning from a given society's forms of knowledge.

== A Sociological Approach to Emotions ==
While disciplines such as psychology focus on individual processes that bring about emotions, sociology takes a closer look at contexts that humans find themselves in and examine how social structures and culture influence emotions within people. Among the many possible disciplines that can approach the topic of emotions, there are specific aspects of Sociology that lend themselves to studying emotions. For example, the discipline of Sociology allows scholars to focus on the impact that factors such as social group (gender, class, race, and so on), culture, time, interactions, and situations may shape or influence human emotion. Sociology of emotions covers a variety of topics and questions as they relate to emotions, such as how emotions emerge within human interaction, how social norms regulate emotional expression and feeling, emotional differences between social groups, classes, and cultures, and so on. Within the discipline of Sociology, there are two specific fields that are particularly primed to approach the study of emotions: social psychology and the sociology of knowledge. In each of these fields, social factors are essential to studying mental structures and mentality.

Some researchers describe these patterned expectations through the idea of an "emotion regime", a term that highlights how social settings define which feelings may be expressed and how they should be managed. This perspective emphasizes that emotions are shaped not only by interpersonal interaction but also by broader arrangements of power, cultural meaning, and institutional norms that authorize certain expressions and discourage others.

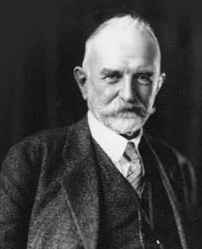
George Herbert Mead

According to George Herbert Mead, the human mind and the social self emerge in conduct with other people in social situations. The mind and self are social objects just like other physical objects, and the human perception of things involves taking a social attitude toward them. All human products are socially constructed and they exist in relation to the social world; what people think of a given object, person, living creature, and so on is determined within and through the process of interaction with others and within social institutions. Therefore, Mead placed mind and self "outside" of the human body in the sense that an individual's own mind and self exist only in relation to other minds and selves through social processes. Mead argued that "mind" is a combination, or structure, of relationships within a social world, and human consciousness functions within this relationship, but is not necessarily contained within a single human body.

The discipline sees human feeling and emotions as something that is experienced and constantly coming into existence in the context of cultural and historical variation; in other words, they shift and change depending on the social situation. Emotions are collective and they are determined by a given culture, community, or society. According to Mead, feelings are related to ideas and develop in relation to the forms of knowledge that shape social factors such as class, generations, and so on. Through the lens of sociology, emotions can be seen as social emergents in the way that they form part of the experience of a particular social group and its age, its experiences, and its responses.

Just as emotions may emerge from social experiences, Sociology is also interested in exploring how institutions and individuals disseminate expert knowledge about emotions. For example, there are many institutional roles such as counselors, therapists, psychologists, and others who practice and disseminate "social knowledge". Thus, emotions can be seen as social objects of human knowledge, efforts, and activities that are formed by social processes and generated by actors and social groups who have placed social significance on feelings and emotions. As social objects, emotions and feelings exist within specific social relationships and within a system of language. For example, discourse within the setting of therapy may assist in the dissemination of psychological knowledge within everyday life. This knowledge, which often includes knowledge about emotions, exists because of the social relationships, and the languages, in which they are discussed.

Some sociologists, especially those within the constructionist perspective, have made the claim that emotions primarily originate in culture. In this instance, members of a society learn emotional vocabulary, expressive behaviors, and shared meanings of every emotion from social relationships with others. Gordon posits that it is only through the socialization process that individuals learn emotion vocabulary that allows them to name internal sensations connected to the objects, events, and relationships that they encounter. While this view recognizes how emotions are influences and constrained by cultural norms, values, and beliefs, evidence from other disciplines and evidence supporting cross-cultural universality of many emotions weaken the claim that all emotions are socially constructed. The social constructionist perspective fails connect the activation, experience, and expressions of emotions to the human body. Despite the fact that emotions are often constrained and fueled by sociocultural contexts, the nature and intensity of an emotion are driven by biological processes. Furthermore, there is a neurology of emotions that can't be ignored within the context of social science. Therefore, many behavioral capacities, including emotions, can't be solely explained by socialization and the constraints of social structures. While the social constructionist argument is not wholly wrong, it fails to recognize the neurological wiring for the production of emotions.

More recent studies within sociology have worked to better recognize the reciprocal relationship between biology and sociocultural processes. Scholars have identified certain elements among emotions that connect to the sociological perspective. According to Turner and Stets, five points include:

1. The biological activation of key body systems
2. Socially constructed cultural definitions and constraints on what emotions should be experienced and expressed in a situation
3. The application of linguistic labels provided by culture to internal sensations
4. The overt expression of emotions through facial, voice, and paralinguistic moves
5. Perceptions and appraisals of situational objects or events.

Thus, according to this view, emotions are aroused by the activation of body systems. But once activated, emotions will be constrained by cognitive processes and culture.

== Emotions Through the Lens of Sociological Theory ==
The relationship between the sociology of emotions and mainstream sociology has not necessarily been seen as straightforward or a strong bond. Some sociologists who focus on emotions have claimed that some of the disciplines founding schools of thought neglect emotional issues, and thus classical theorists are not always included in the discussion of the sociology of emotions.

Chris Schilling claims that the major traditions of sociological theory developed a particular interest in the social and moral dimensions of emotions, although the subject itself often came through the discussion of other disparate concepts within classical sociology. While interpretations of the sociological tradition vary in significant ways, it can be helpful to understand two distinct ways that the subject has been separated. According to Alan Dawe, sociology can be split into a sociology of order and a sociology of action. Through this lens, the role of the study of emotions becomes more evident. While Sociology does not have a discipline-specific definition for emotions, there is evidence within classic analyses that emotions were a phenomenon that were concerned with how people experienced and expressed their contact and experiences within the social and natural worlds. Out of the many classical sociological theorists, Auguste Comte, Emile Durkheim, Georg Simmel, and Max Weber played a particularly significant role in addressing the discipline of Sociology's concerns with order and action, both of which the topic of emotions is prominent.

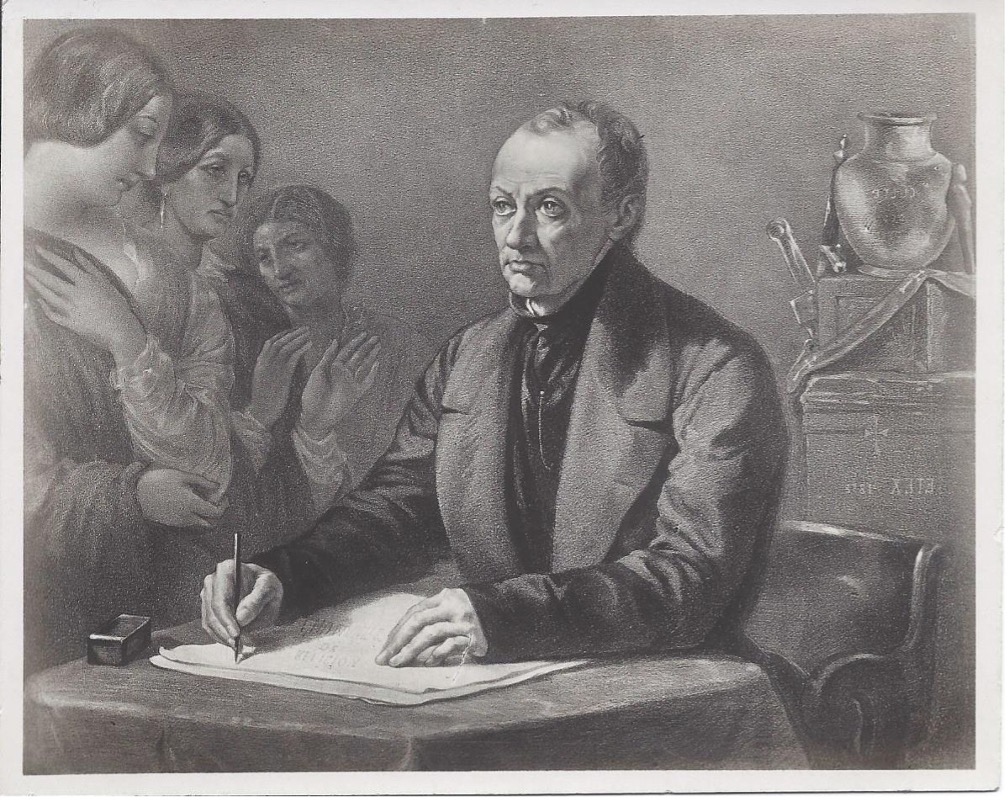
Auguste Comte

=== Order and Emotions ===
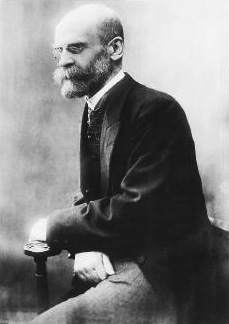
Emile Durkheim

Within a given society, there are institutions - such as the family, education, religion, and so on - that serve as a guiding source of moral sentiments and thoughts which influence the individuals within the society. Within classical sociological texts, a tension can be found within the description of individual humans: a duality between asocial impulses and social capacities. For classical theorists such as Jean-Jacques Rousseau, the "natural man" is motivated by instinct and impulse, but within the context of civil society, these "animalistic" traits transform into morals such justice or duty. This type of idea influenced Comte, and later his successor, Durkheim, both scholars of the French tradition who believed that society possessed the "status of a moral absolute". In this way, they viewed Society like a human body or organism, where there were different "parts" that each worked to fulfill the needs of the social whole. Both Comte and Durkheim pointed to the idea that it was the social collective that stimulated and directed emotions in a way that supported a broader societal moral order.

=== Action and Emotions ===
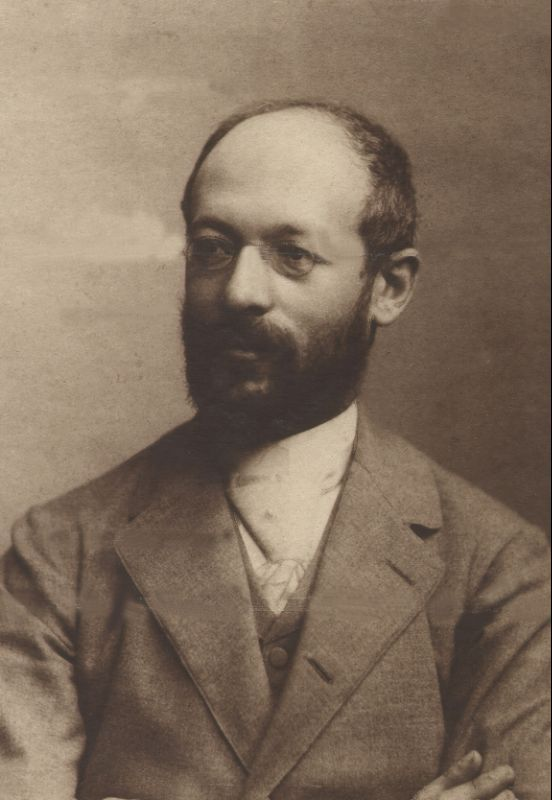
Georg Simmel

While Comte and Durkheim's theories stemmed from the idea of a social whole, there was another school of thought - the German tradition - that believed that it was the creative and ethical abilities within an individual that led humans to construct their own social and moral environment. Within this context, two main views of emotions emerged: 1) emotions were seen as an impediment to self-determining actions, and 2) emotional capacities allowed people to transcend their limitations and become their "true selves". German sociologist and philosopher Georg Simmel introduce the concept of the "moral soul", which views the soul as an individual possession and stimulates the need for an individually unique personality that contains emotions and intellect within the overall identity. Simmel believed that the soul helps resolve internal conflicts between a person's individual, pre-social emotions and abilities and their social capacities. In Simmel's view, it is interaction alone that shapes the development of the soul, but the form of the interactions lead to a rigid development. Simmel believed that interactions develop through the creation of shared mental orientations and social emotions that stem from human associations.

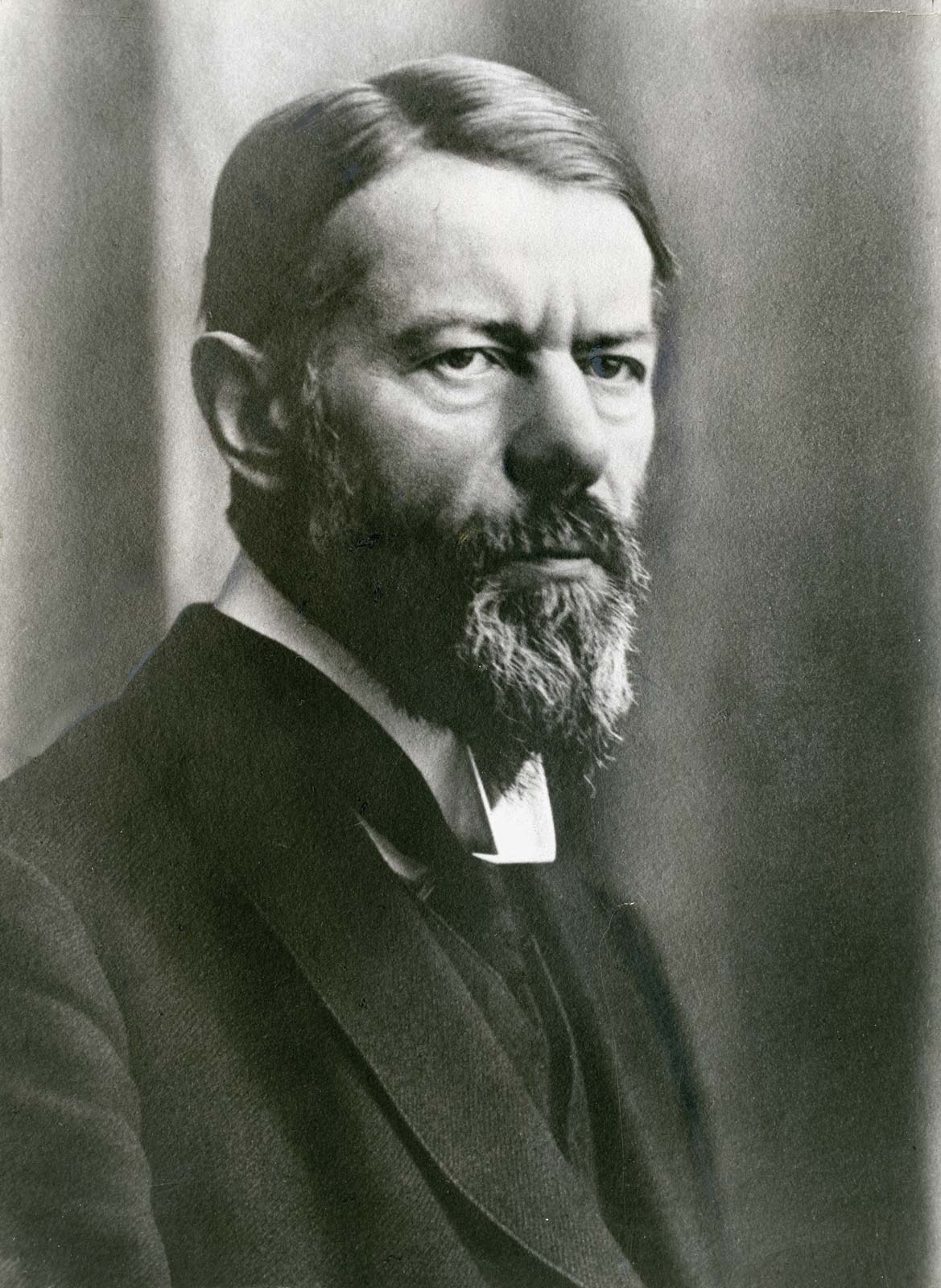
Max Weber

German sociologist Max Weber also looped emotions in with action. Instead of seeing emotion as a motivator of action, Weber suggested that individuals should channel their emotional selves in an effort to freely choose rational actions. Weber saw rationalization as a way that humans increase their knowledge of how to pursue goals in the realm of science and technology, but in turn detracted from emotions that can come with experience, such as charisma.

== Social Relations and Emotions ==
Through a sociological lens, emotions can be seen as instigated by the social relationships that humans find themselves in. Emotions serve as responses to events within the social environment, and often other people, groups of people, or categories of people serve as objects of emotions. Even when the self is the object of emotions, it is still thought of in terms of social relationships. From feeling joy after hearing a loved one's good news, to feeling nostalgia while talking to an old friend, to feeling sadness after being insulted, there are a variety of emotions that stem in consequence of what one interaction partner may do to the other.

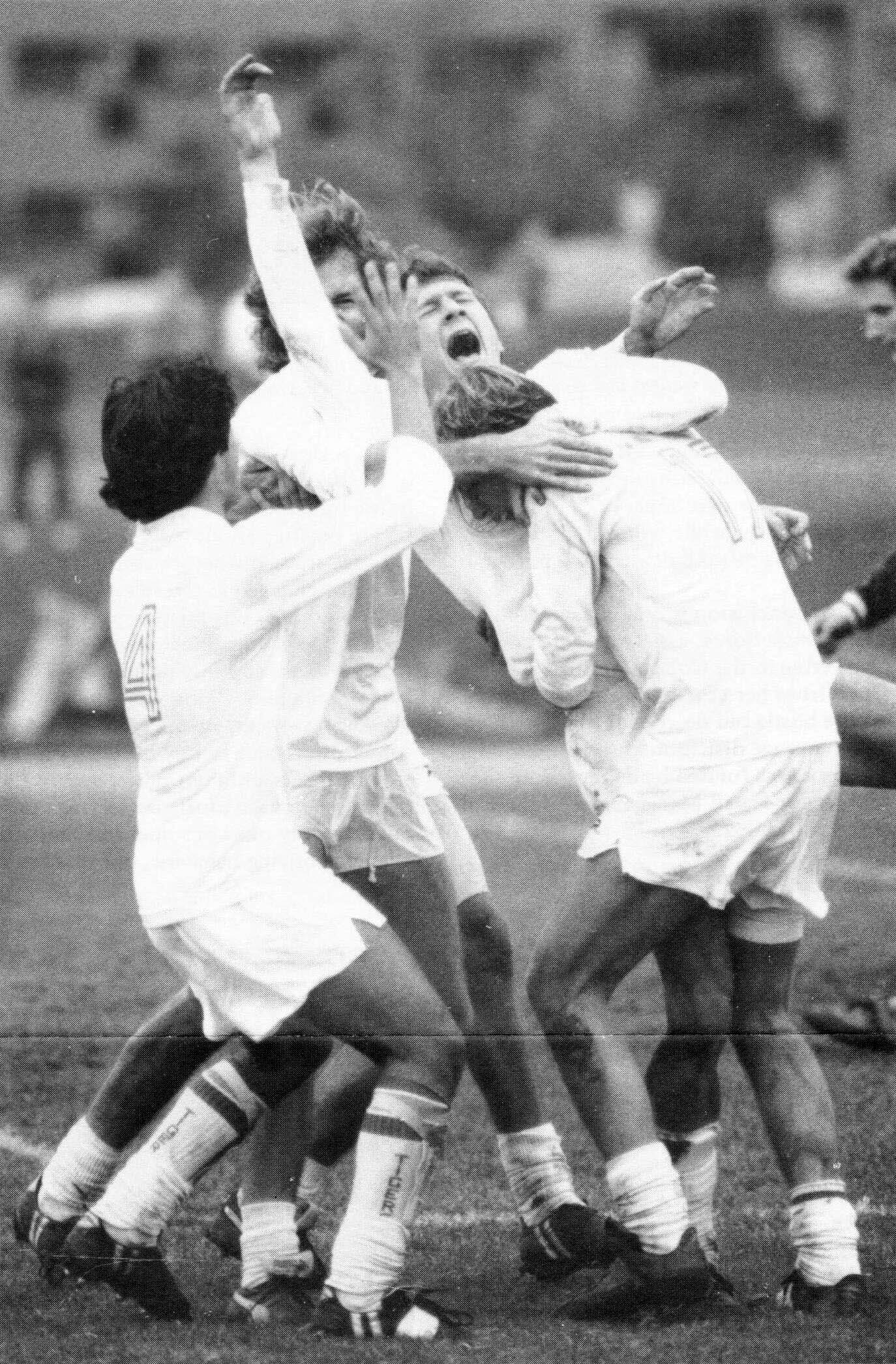
Sports wins serve as one of many examples of emotional expression, where athletes often present specific facial expressions that indicate feelings of joy, relief, excitement, and so on.

=== Emotional Expressions ===
Within face-to-face and video conversations, humans perceive emotions through facial expressions. Starting at infancy, the human brain begins to learn how to perceive faces through social exposure and experiences. Faces serve as a rich source of information within social contexts and can help people navigate the social world: facial expressions help people express their own emotions and the emotions of others, identify potential mates, discern who to trust, who may need help, and they even play a role in determining levels of innocence or guilt. Facial expressions may vary slightly depending on a given culture or society, but there exists a common - or classical - view where certain emotion categories are reliably signaled by certain facial configurations. Extending beyond face-to-face human interaction, electronic messages now contain emojis and emoticons that represent facial expressions for various emotion categories.
