= Affective labor =

Work that is intended to produce or modify emotional reactions

Affective labor is work carried out that is intended to produce or modify emotional experiences in people. This is in contrast to emotional labor, which is intended to produce or modify one's own emotional experiences. Coming out of Autonomist feminist critiques of marginalized and so-called "invisible" labor, it has been the focus of critical discussions by, e.g., Antonio Negri, Michael Hardt, Juan Martin Prada, and Michael Betancourt.

Although its history is as old as that of labor itself, affective labor has been of increasing importance to modern economies since the emergence of mass culture in the nineteenth century. The most visible institutionalized form of affective labor is perhaps advertising, which typically attempts to make audiences relate to products through particular effects. Yet there are many other areas in which affective labor figures prominently, including service and care industries whose purpose is to make people feel in particular ways. Domestic work, frequently ignored by other analysts of labor, has also been a critical focus of theories of affective labor.

== History ==
The phrase affective labor, seen broadly, has its roots in the Autonomist critiques of the 1970s, in particular those that theorize a dynamic form of capitalism that is able to move away from purely industrial labor. In particular, the "Fragment on Machines," from Marx's Grundrisse, and conceptions of immaterial labor decentered the focus of labor theory and sparked debate over what constituted real labor:

No longer does the worker insert a modified natural thing (Naturgegenstand) as middle link between the object (Objekt) and himself; rather, he inserts the process of nature, transformed into an industrial process, as a means between himself and inorganic nature, mastering it. He steps to the side of the production process instead of being its chief actor. In this transformation, it is neither the direct human labour he himself performs, nor the time during which he works, but rather the appropriation of his own general productive power, his understanding of nature and his mastery over it by virtue of his presence as a social body – it is, in a word, the development of the social individual which appears as the great foundation-stone of production and of wealth.

Meanwhile, movements such as Selma James and Mariarosa Dalla Costa's Wages for housework campaign attempted to activate the most exploited and invisible sectors of the economy and challenge the typical, male and industrial focus of labor studies.

== Hardt and Negri ==
Antonio Negri and Michael Hardt have begun to develop this concept in their books Empire and Multitude: War and Democracy in the Age of Empire.

In their recent work, Hardt and Negri focus on the role affective labor plays in the current mode of production (which can be referred to as "imperial", "late capitalist", or "postmodern"). In this passage from Multitude they briefly define their key terms:

"Unlike emotions, which are mental phenomena, affects refer equally to body and mind. In fact, affects, such as joy and sadness, reveal the present state of life in the entire organism, expressing a certain state of the body along with a certain mode of thinking. Affective labor, then, is labor that produces or manipulates affects.... One can recognize affective labor, for example, in the work of legal assistants, flight attendants, and fast food workers (service with a smile). One indication of the rising importance of affective labor, at least in the dominant countries, is the tendency for employers to highlight education, attitude, character, and "prosocial" behavior as the primary skills employees need. A worker with a good attitude and social skills is another way of saying a worker is adept at affective labor."

The most important point in their scholarship with respect to this issue is that immaterial labor, of which affective labor is a specific form, has achieved dominance in the current mode of production. This does not mean that there are more immaterial laborers than material laborers, or that immaterial labor produces more capital than material labor. Instead, this dominance is signaled by the fact that, in developed countries, labor is more often figured as immaterial than material. To illustrate the significance of this claim, they draw a comparison between the early twenty-first century and that of the mid-nineteenth century, famously engaged by Karl Marx, in which factory labor was dominant even if it was not the form of labor practiced by the most people. One popular, albeit slightly less than perfect example, of this might be that, whereas Fred Flintstone, as an average American, drove a crane in a quarry, Homer Simpson sits at a desk and provides safety.

== Role in the political economy ==
Michael Betancourt has suggested that affective labor may have a role in the development and maintenance of what he has termed "agnotologic capitalism". His point is that affective labor is a symptom of the disassociation between the reality of capitalist economy and the alienation it produces:

The affective labor created to address this alienation is part of the mechanisms where the agnotological order maintains its grip on the social: managing the emotional states of the consumers, who also serve as the labor reserve, is a necessary precondition for the effective management of the quality and range of information.

His construction of affective labor is concerned with its role as an enabler for a larger capitalist superstructure, where the reduction of alienation is a precondition for the elimination of dissent. Affective labor is part of a larger activity where the population is distracted by affective pursuits and fantasies of economic advancement.

== See also ==
- Advertising
- Digital labor
- Emotion work
- Emotional labor
- Labour economics
