= Unpaid work =

Labor that does not receive any direct remuneration

Unpaid labor or unpaid work is defined as labor or work that does not receive any direct remuneration. This is a form of non-market work which can fall into one of two categories: (1) unpaid work that is placed within the production boundary of the System of National Accounts (SNA), such as gross domestic product (GDP); and (2) unpaid work that falls outside of the production boundary (non-SNA work), such as unpaid care work and other household activities undertaken for one’s own consumption. Unpaid labor takes many forms and is not limited to activities within a household. Major components include unpaid care and household work, volunteering as a form of charity work, and unpaid internships. In many countries, unpaid care work is disproportionately performed by women due to gender norms and inequalities. Governments and policy institutions have adopted a number of initiatives aimed at reducing the burden of unpaid work, including supporting childcare services.

== The production boundary ==
The production boundary is the name given by economists to the imaginary line between unpaid work, which is not counted directly in the gross domestic product, and paid work that the GDP does count. Production boundary includes goods or services that are supplied to units other producers, including the production of goods or services used up in the process of producing such goods or services; and the "own-account production of housing services by owner-occupiers and of domestic and personal services produced by employing paid domestic staff", according to the 2001 OECD Economist Diane Coyle described how the digital revolution and the COVID-19 pandemic has increased debates on establishing the production boundary, which involves measuring 'true' productivity. Millions of volunteer hours of unpaid work contribute to free services that others consume via social media and Wikipedia in a new parallel economy. This unpaid work contributes a real monetary value to the digital platforms' owners that is included in the GDP, while all the unpaid work is on the wrong side of the production boundary and is therefore not counted.

== Types ==
=== Internships ===
An internship is a period of work experience offered by an organization for a limited period of time. Once confined to medical graduates, internship is used to practice for a wide range of placements in businesses, non-profit organizations, government agencies and political parties. They are typically undertaken by students and graduates looking to gain relevant skills and experience in a particular field. Employers benefit from these placements because they often recruit employees from their best interns, who have known capabilities, thus saving time and money in the long run. Internships are usually arranged by third-party organizations that recruit interns on behalf of industry groups. Rules vary from country to country about when interns should be regarded as employees. The system can be open to exploitation by unscrupulous employers.

=== Unpaid care work ===
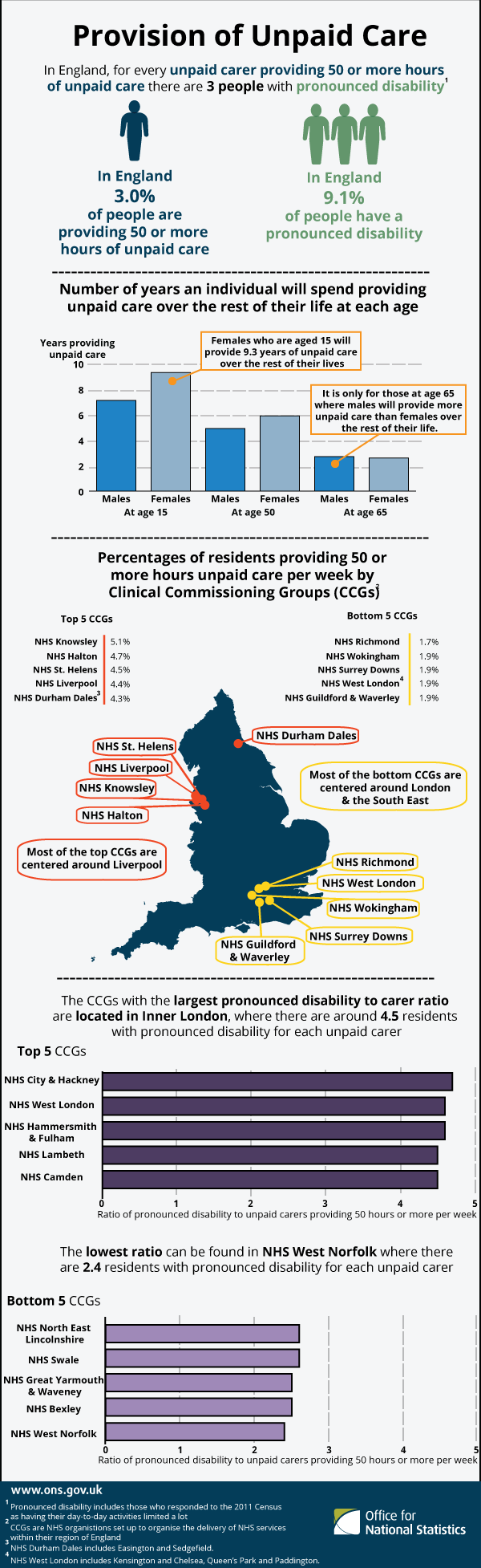
Infographic of statistics on unpaid care in England

Unpaid care work is commonly defined as care provided to family members without direct monetary compensation, but it also includes other unpaid productive activities such as growing food for own consumption and collecting water and fuel. Within unpaid household labor, scholars often distinguish between housework and child care as two major categories. Housework includes activities such as cooking, cleaning, laundry, and household management, while child care involves direct and indirect care of children. Unpaid care and domestic work sustain households and contribute to the reproduction of the labor force across generations.

=== Unpaid domestic work ===
Unpaid domestic work is often connected with unpaid care work. The international charity Oxfam has stated that "most of the work done by women around the world is unpaid", including the performance of "domestic duties such as cooking and cleaning", and the mental health consequences of women's unpaid work have been explored by Soraya Seedat and Marta Rondon in the British Medical Journal. They noted that "the gendered nature of unpaid work" has intensified since 2020 as a consequence of the global COVID-19 pandemic, with examples of various countries where women's unpaid work has grown more quickly that men's.

=== Shadow work ===
Shadow work is a concept in economics identifying tasks performed by consumers, as a complement of industrial labor and services, as unpaid labor. It includes assembling of goods as components, self-checkout, and self-service at gas stations. This contrasts with the well-established view of unpaid labor done for self-subsistence or to give to others, encompassing all tasks individuals do without compensation.

The term was coined by Ivan Illich in his 1980 article and in his 1981 book of the same title.

Craig Lambert, a former editor of Harvard Magazine wrote about the new trend towards unpaid "shadow work" in 2011 and followed up his research in a book called Shadow Work: The Unpaid, Unseen Jobs That Fill Your Day in 2015. In it, he itemizes many of the unpaid tasks ordinary people do now that others used to do, such as pumping gasoline, bagging groceries, making travel arrangements, and checking in baggage at airports. He includes the rise of technology and robotics as forces leading to the growth of shadow work, and also includes such factors as crowdsourcing and parental over-engagement in their children's lives. He argues that shifting tasks to consumers takes away from their time and reduces the amount of casual social interaction in people's lives. It also limits the number of opportunities for low-skilled entry-level work (such as pumping gas).

== Data ==
The most commonly used method for measuring unpaid work, particularly unpaid care work and volunteering, is through time-use surveys. These surveys collect information on how individuals allocate their time over a 24-hour period, typically using diary-based methods that record time spent in paid employment, unpaid household labor, caregiving, and other activities. Time-use data are used to estimate the distribution of unpaid domestic work within households and across populations.

== See also ==
- Care work
- Child care
- Cognitive labor
- Double burden
- Emotional labor
- Feminist economics
- Housewife
- Human capital
- Labour economics
- Invisible labor
- Precariat
- Unfunded mandate
- Universal basic income
