= Gemma Hartley =

American author and journalist

Gemma Hartley is an American author and journalist whose article in Harper's Bazaar on emotional labor led to her book Fed Up: Emotional Labor, Women, and the Way Forward (HarperCollins, 2018).

== Work ==
In 2017, Hartley wrote an article for Harper's Bazaar entitled "Women Aren't Nags—We're Just Fed Up," about the struggles women in heterosexual relationships face in trying to divide household labor equitably, including both the visible labor and the invisible labor that women end up doing much more of. The article went viral, earning millions of views and social media shares, bringing forward the subject of emotional labor that women disproportionally bear, and sparking a national conversation on gender inequality. The attention the article gained created interest from book publishers, and Hartley got book deal to expand the concept. In 2018, HarperCollins published Hartley's book, Fed Up: Emotional Labor, Women, and the Way Forward. In Fed Up, Hartley highlights the many ways women carry unequal labor burdens within the household, both seen and unseen, and offers solutions on having productive conversations to equalize that labor. Hartley describes emotional labor as a cultural problem that's taught to all of us at a young age and deeply ingrained, and it must therefore be addressed that way, as a cultural problem we must unlearn. Fed Up offers solutions for avoiding gender inequality and undue emotional labor for women in the workplace.

Fed Up has been compared to Soraya Chemaly's book Rage Becomes Her, Rebecca Traister's Good and Mad, and other books focused on women's anger over various aspects of gender inequality.

Aside from emotional labor, Hartley also writes extensively about feminism, the challenges of motherhood, and work culture.

=== Criticism ===
Hartley has been criticized for misusing the term "emotional labor", which was originated by in 1983 by sociologist Arlie Hochschild in the book The Managed Heart. Hochschild argues that emotional labor refers only to the emotional work required in some paid professions, such as flight attendants needing to smile and look pleasant, and not to unpaid labor in the home, as Hartley defines it.

Hartley has responded that she does not think "emotional labor" is the best term for her topic, and that she prefers to talk about "invisible labor." But because emotional labor was the term people knew it as, her publisher asked her to stick with that term for the book.

== Personal ==
Hartley is married, has three children, and lives in Reno, Nevada.
