= Afterburn =

Afterburn may refer to:

- Excess post-exercise oxygen consumption, the burning of calories after vigorous exercise
- Back-fire, an unintended explosion produced by a vehicle's engine
- Afterburn (psychotherapy), a psychological term used during the application of psychotherapy
- Afterburn (1992 film), a film starring Laura Dern
- Afterburn (2025 film), an American post-apocalyptic science fiction action film
- Afterburner, an optional component in jet engines
- Agnelli & Nelson, who write and produce dance music, under the name Afterburn, among others
- Afterburn (roller coaster), a Bolliger & Mabillard coaster at Carowinds
- WWE Afterburn, a television show produced by World Wrestling Entertainment
