= Digital labor =

Digital labor or digital labour refers to forms of labor mediated by digital technologies, typically performed through or enabled by internet platforms, software systems, and data infrastructures. It includes a wide range of activities such as data annotation, content moderation, clickwork, platform-mediated gig work, and user-generated content. While some forms of digital labor are formally compensated, many are informal, underpaid, or entirely unpaid, often blurring the boundaries between work and leisure.

Digital labor plays a foundational role in the digital economy by supplying the human input needed to train artificial intelligence (AI), maintain online platforms, and generate monetizable content and data. Scholars from media studies, sociology, information science, and political economy have examined the ways in which digital infrastructures reshape labor, value creation, and power dynamics. The term raises questions about labor rights, algorithmic control, surveillance, and the commodification of human activity in a data-driven world.

== Definition and scope ==
Digital labor encompasses diverse types of work that depend on digital platforms and infrastructures. It ranges from formalized gig work (e.g., food delivery or ride-hailing), to less visible or unpaid tasks, such as labeling images to train AI, moderating content, or generating engagement on social media platforms. These tasks are often governed by algorithms and platform policies, rather than traditional employment contracts. These tasks are also governed by what Mary. L Gray and Siddharth Suri term "ghost work," a paradox of automation where the more advanced a system appears, the more it relies on a hidden labor force to manage edge cases and data validation. Gray and Suri note that labor often occurs in environments where workers are isolated from one another. The labor is used to perform fragmented tasks necessary for these platforms to function. This work is frequently socially silenced to allow for tech conglomerates in the Global North to market their services as magic. However, the human intervention required to maintain this illusion remains unrecognized.

Many scholars have discussed the emotional work of digital production. For instance, digital workers' exposure to inappropriate and explicit content can result in significant psychological trauma such as traumatic stress due to the graphic nature of the content they must moderate.

== Origins ==
As production-based industries declined, the rise of a digital and information-based economy fostered the development of the digital labor market. The rise of digital labor is attributed to the shift from the Industrial Revolution to the Information Age. Digital labor can be connected to the economic process of disintermediation, where digital labor has taken away the job of the mediator in employee-employer supply chains.

Digital labor markets are websites or economies that facilitate the production, trade, and selling of digital content, code, digital products, or other goods emerging from digital and technological environments. A widely used example of a digital labor market is Amazon Mechanical Turk. Other forms of emergent digital subcultures including community forums, blogs, and gamers utilize digital labor as organizing tools.

== On-demand platforms ==
On-demand work has grown alongside widespread Internet access and mobile technology. Platforms cover various sectors: rental (e.g., Airbnb), transportation (e.g., Uber), food delivery, home services, and education. Workers on such platforms are often classified as independent contractors, limiting their labor protections. Data generated by users and workers fuels platform improvement and monetization.

== Social media ==
Most value on social media platforms is created by users through posts, likes, and engagement. This user activity is a form of unpaid digital labor. Platforms monetize this labor through advertising and data extraction. The concept relates to participatory culture, where audiences contribute to cultural production, often without compensation.

== Relation to AI and data economies ==
Human digital labor underpins AI systems. Tasks like labeling, moderating, or annotating are crucial for training datasets. While AI is often seen as replacing human labor, it depends heavily on invisible human work. This connection has been explored in works like Ghost Work by Mary L. Gray and Siddharth Suri. Research on AI content moderation is an important area that requires more discussion. Sarah T. Roberts characterizes the manual removal of harmful or graphic content as "digital refuse," arguing that because this work relies on human cultural judgement, it cannot be fully automated or offloaded to AI to do the parsing. This process is often marketed as a miraculous cure for social problems, a phenomenon known as "AI Snake Oil," as discussed by Reece Rogers. This leads to more technical limitations and a reliance on hidden human labor to correct data leakage. Rogers notes that this necessitates a form of "AI Agnosticism," demanding transparency regarding the data and labor involved before accepting how effective these tools really are.

== Theoretical perspectives ==
Media theorists describe digital labor as a form of immaterial labor. Political economists highlight algorithmic control, surveillance, and fragmentation of work. Scholars such as Trebor Scholz, Christian Fuchs, and Tiziana Terranova frame it as part of a broader critique of digital capitalism and platform economies.

== Digital labor rights and regulation ==
Debates around digital labor include worker classification, fair compensation, and the impact of algorithmic management. Many workers lack benefits or protections. Scholars have called for clearer regulation, including minimum standards for pay, safety, and transparency in algorithmic decision-making. Andrew Selbst and his colleagues identify a "socio-technical abstraction trap," suggesting that technical solutions alone cannot solve algorithmic bias. They argue for what they term a "fair-ML" community approach to regulation that moves beyond code to include the social and legal consequences of a platform's deployment. This would specifically target racist impacts built into these systems. To address this foundation, they argue that stronger legislation must be passed to target these systemic impacts.

== Geographies and demographics of digital laborers ==
Much work has suggested that certain types of platform labor are gendered and digital labor can be linked to broader social and structural inequalities. Digital labor is globally distributed, often outsourcing lower-paid work to the Global South. Studies in Europe and Africa reveal gender disparities in access, pay, and task allocation. Lilly Irani's work explores how digital labor is delegated to workers in the Global South through neocolonial pathways and packaged as a form of entrepreneurship. Building on this critique of the exploitation of laborers in the Global South, Ruha Benjamin examines in Race After Technology how global digital infrastructures often encode historical inequalities. This is a phenomenon she terms the "New Jim Code." She argues that capitalism relies on obscuring the exploitation of marginalized tech workers. This is done by hiding these workers behind what is meant to be algorithmic objectivity and automation.

== Criticism and debates ==
Some argue that expanding the notion of labor to include all online activity risks diluting the term. Others see it as essential to recognizing hidden work in the digital economy. Scholars debate the ethics of monetizing unpaid user activity and the implications of platform dependence.

Some scholars argue that digital labor is often structured through global inequalities, with much of this work outsourced to workers in the Global South under precarious conditions, relating digital labor to historical power relations. Some argue that platforms benefit from obscuring this labor, presenting their services as automated while relying on large workforces to perform tasks such as content moderation and data labeling.

== Archival Justice ==
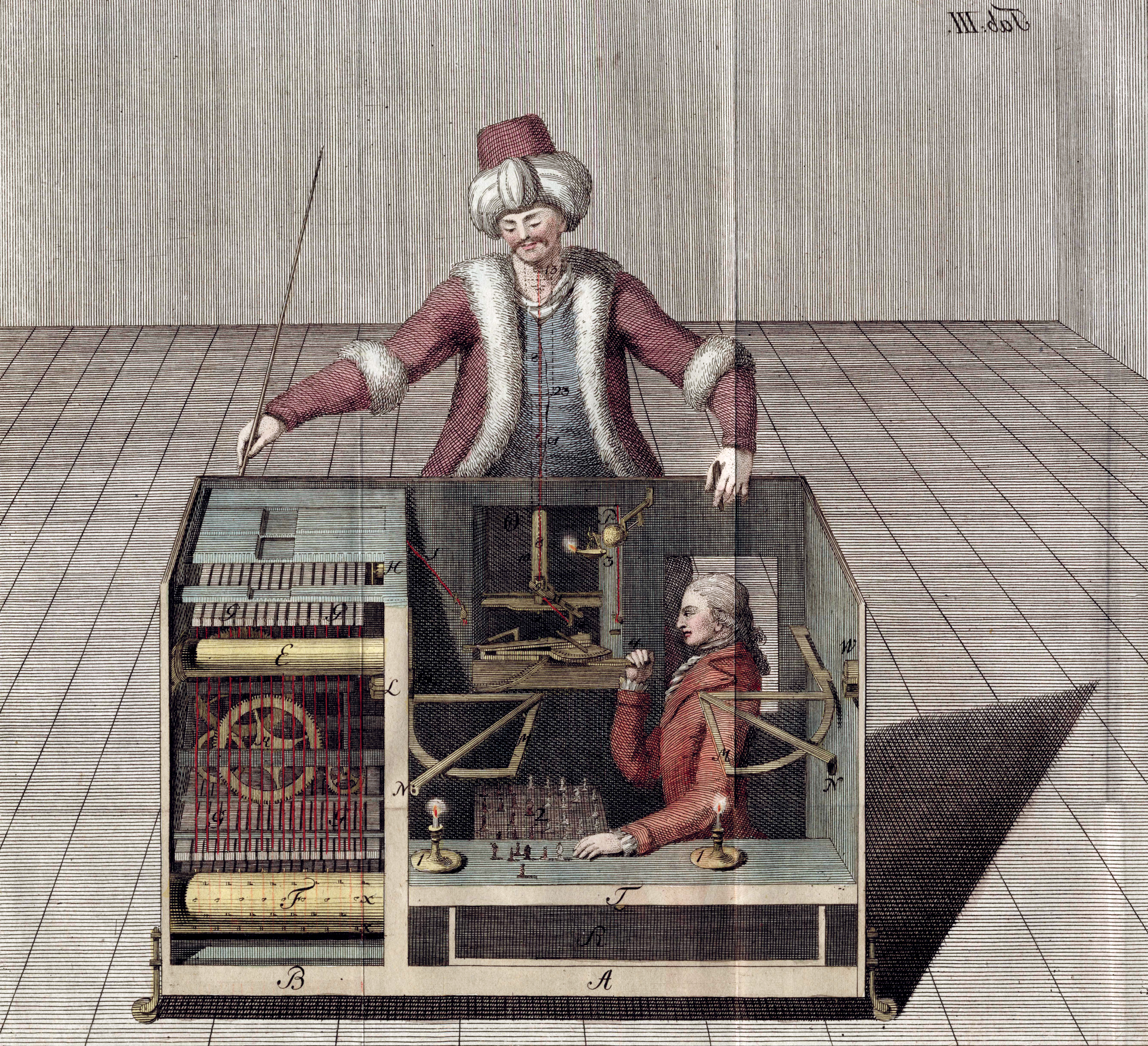
Image of Kempelen's "The Turk"

Research into the socio-technical impacts of digital labor are frequently published into journals including Big Data & Society. Scholars that have published into this journal, such as Francesca Tripodi and Mackenzie Lemieux, have examined how Wikipedia's own notability standards can be clouded by gender and race. They argue that these systemic biases often marginalize BIPOC and women laborers who perform foundational work of the digital economy. By focusing on these counter-narratives, researchers are able to view this from an anthropological lens which can better expose hidden social silences within these infrastructures. Again, these structures appear to be automated, but are masked with ghost work which relies on unrecognized human intervention to ensure these systems are maintained.

This dynamic of hidden labor is represented in Kempelen's "The Turk," which was an automaton that created the illusion of machine intelligence because the human operator was concealed. AI is a contemporary iteration of this because, as similarly discussed by Gray and Suri, the digital labor appears like magic by masking the human effort.

== See also ==
- Algorithmic management
- Amazon Mechanical Turk
- Clickwork
- Cybertariat
- Digital economy
- Invisible labour
- Microwork
- Platform capitalism
- Surveillance capitalism

== Bibliography ==
- Scholz, Trebor (ed.). Digital Labor: The Internet as Playground and Factory. Routledge, 2013.
- Srnicek, Nick. Platform Capitalism. Polity, 2016.
- Gray, Mary L., and Siddharth Suri. Ghost Work: How to Stop Silicon Valley from Building a New Global Underclass. Houghton Mifflin Harcourt, 2019.
- van Dijck, José. The Culture of Connectivity: A Critical History of Social Media. Oxford University Press, 2013.
- Pasquale, Frank. The Black Box Society: The Secret Algorithms That Control Money and Information. Harvard University Press, 2015.
- Zuboff, Shoshana. The Age of Surveillance Capitalism. PublicAffairs, 2019.
- Terranova, Tiziana. "Free Labor: Producing Culture for the Digital Economy." Social Text, 2000.
