= Immaterial labor =

Marxian economic framework

Immaterial labor is a framework with origins in Marxist-based political economy, particularly Autonomist political philosophy, to describe how value is produced from affective and cognitive activities, which, in various ways, are commodified in capitalist economies.

The concept of immaterial labor was coined by Italian sociologist and philosopher Maurizio Lazzarato in his 1996 essay "Immaterial Labor", published as a contribution to Radical Thought in Italy and edited by Virno and Hardt. It was re-published in 1997 as: Lavoro immateriale. Forme di vita e produzione di soggettività. (Ombre corte). Lazzarato was a participant in the Years of Lead (Italy) group as a student in Padua in the 1970s, and is a member of the editorial group of the journal Multitudes. Post-Marxist scholars including Franco Berardi, Antonio Negri, Michael Hardt, Judith Revel, and Paolo Virno, among others have also employed the concept.

== Areas of application ==
=== Digital capitalism ===
Studies of immaterial labor have included analysis of high-technology industries, although immaterial labor is understood as a concept far pre-dating digital technologies, specifically in the performance of gender and domestic roles, and other aspects of affective and cognitive work.

Themes commonly associated with immaterial labor in the context of the internet include: digital labor, commons-based peer production, and user-generated content production, which might include open source, free software, crowdsourcing, and flexible licensing agreements, as well as the collapse of copyright amidst the ambiguities of sharing creative works in the digital age, digital care work, and other conditions produced by participation in social environments within the digital, knowledge economy.

=== Feminism ===
Feminism adopted discussions of immaterial labor to describe the alienating conditions and labors pertaining to care work, the performance of gender and domestic labor. The social-wage campaign, Wages for housework, co-founded in 1972 in Italy, by Selma James called for a wage for domestic work amidst the uneven and gendered privatization of the labor of social production, where traditionally feminine roles like care work are undervalued.

Post-colonial feminist writer Lisa Nakamura, and others have described immaterial labor in the performance of online identity, and racial identity and identity performance, or "avatarization of the self". Nakamura concerns herself with the role of women of color integrated, and often undermined, into the circuit of production. In "Indigenous Circuits: Navajo Women and the Racialization of Early Electronic Manufacture" Nakamura draws upon feminist theorist Donna Haraway's Cyborg Manifesto to understand the role of the production chain and a commodification of Navajo women textile work. This relationship between craft and industrial labor ties into larger concepts of gender stereotypes, surveillance, and the identity politics of globalization. Her historical research lends itself to this broader discussion, "They were cited as evidence that digital work—the work of the hand and its digits—could be painlessly transferred from the indigenous cultural context into the world of technological commercial innovation, benefiting both in the process."

Consent agreements or contracts between social media and user-generated content platforms and their users have been proposed as a way of minimizing immaterial labor by allowing users to have more control over the use and circulation of the content, data, and metadata they produce.

=== Creative works ===
The idea of "creative labor" has been analyzed in the context of immaterial labor.

It has also been argued that the ubiquitous sharing enabled by the digital age has made it harder for artists and creators to claim authorship of their works, creating an inevitable situation of immaterial labor in the participation in many online platforms.

== Criticism ==
=== Material vs. immaterial labor debate ===
The material effects of what immaterial labor claims are cognitive and affective activities, has been consistently used to discredit the idea of immaterial labor. Critics of the term have argued that, although labor might produce affective and cognitive commodities that can be defined as immaterial labors, it nonetheless is always embodied, maintaining correlates in the physical, material world.

Autonomist feminists have also taken issue with the use of the word "immaterial" to describe affective and care work, which necessarily maintains an affective and embodied component.

== See also ==
- Digital labor
- Affective labor
- Emotional labor
- Microwork
- Post-Fordism
- Post-Marxism
- Reproductive labor
- Computer and network surveillance
- Hyperreality
- Wages for housework

== Bibliography ==
- Berardi, Franco. 2009. The soul at work: from alienation to autonomy. Los Angeles, CA: Semiotext(e).
- Michael Hardt, and Antonio Negri. 2004. Multitude: War and Democracy in the Age of Empire. New York: The Penguin Press.
