= Invisible labor =

Unseen and undervalued work

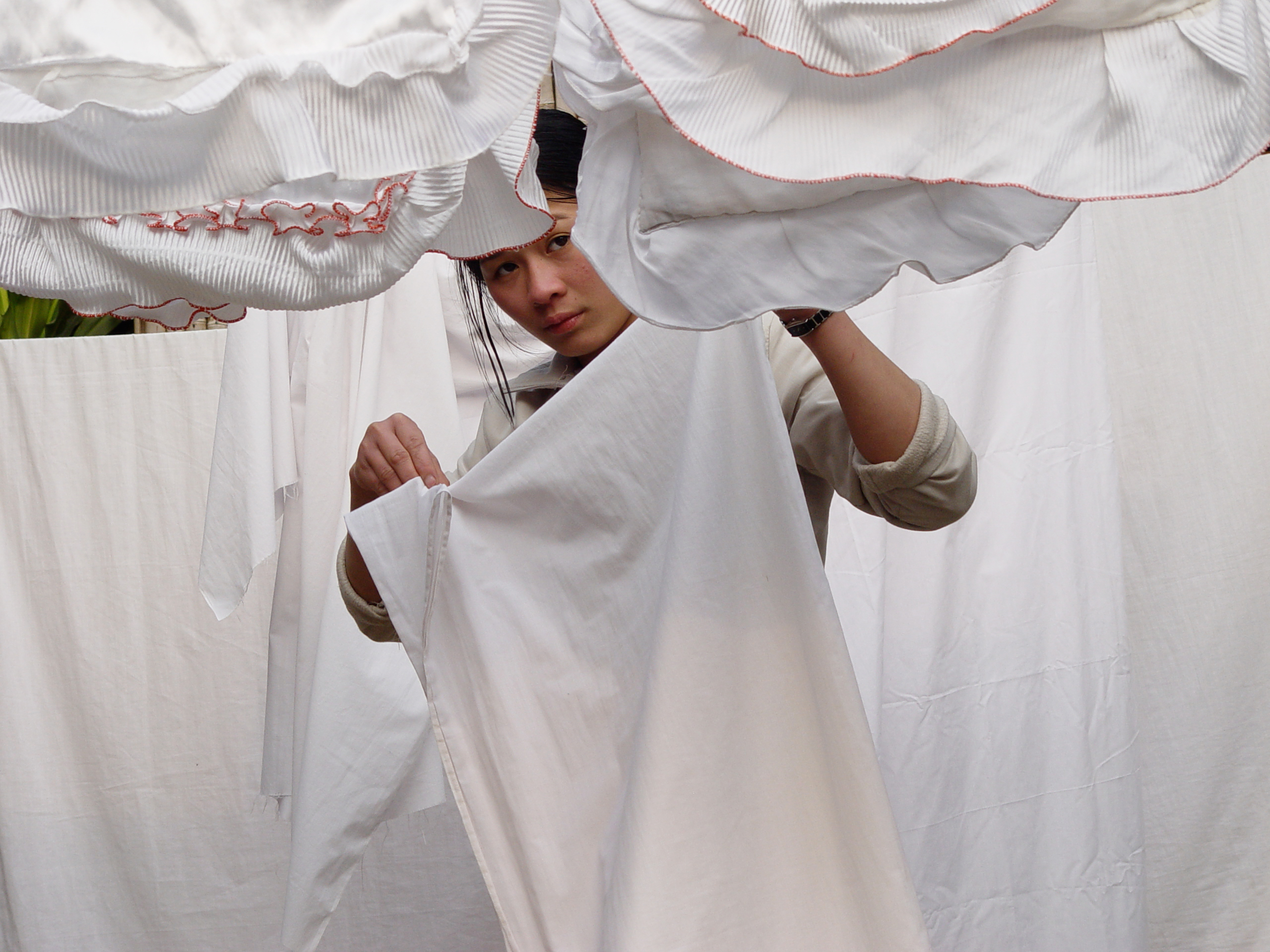
Invisible labor is most often done by women and racial minorities.

Invisible labor is a philosophical, sociological, and economic concept applying to work that is unseen, unvalued or undervalued, and often discounted as not important, despite its essential role in supporting the functioning of workplaces, families, teams, and organizations. The term was coined by Arlene Kaplan Daniels in the 1980s.

The term has been applied to academics, scientists, interpreters, wait staff, secretaries, and women in the household, who bear most of the invisible labor in terms of cleaning, planning, and organizing. Even when women are equally employed, they still are responsible for the majority of invisible labor, including cognitive labor.

Research by the OECD (Organization for Economic Co-operation and Development) across 25 member countries found that between one-third and one-half of all valuable economic activity goes unaccounted for in GDP per capita. At the European level, unpaid family care work has been valued at between 17% and 31.6% of EU GDP depending on methodology. According to the International Monetary Fund, women perform on average two more hours of unpaid work per day than men, undermining female labor force participation and lowering economy-wide productivity; redistributing this burden through policy could generate gains of up to 4% of GDP. Economists see that invisible labor functions as an implicit subsidy to market production, and that invisible labor is linked to gender inequality, where women have less access to managing assets and to where women have not as strong of an equality in their marriages and in countries that are less economically developed we see more women take on the load of invisible labor.

Invisible labor has a toll on the mental, physical, and psychological well-being of those who perform it, and it reflects ongoing power dynamics and gender imbalances between those whose work 'counts' and those whose work remains 'unseen.' Invisible labor also falls disproportionately on marginalized groups as a factor of race or other identity characteristics, to the point it has been referred to as "cultural taxation."

Strategies for addressing invisible labor include acknowledgement and increasing visibility, distributing tasks more equally, implementing policies that recognize or reduce such work, challenging disparate gender and racial roles, and assigning economic value to unpaid labor.

The concept continues to influence public discourse through books and movies. Technology has not reduced invisible labor, despite expectations or promises that it would.

== See also ==
- Academic tenure
- Care drain
- Care work
- Cognitive labor
- Double burden
- Emotional labor
- Feminist economics
- Gender role
- Glass ceiling
- Precariat
- Reproductive labor
- Shadow work
- Standpoint theory
