= Shadow work =

Unpaid labor as a complement of industrial labour and services

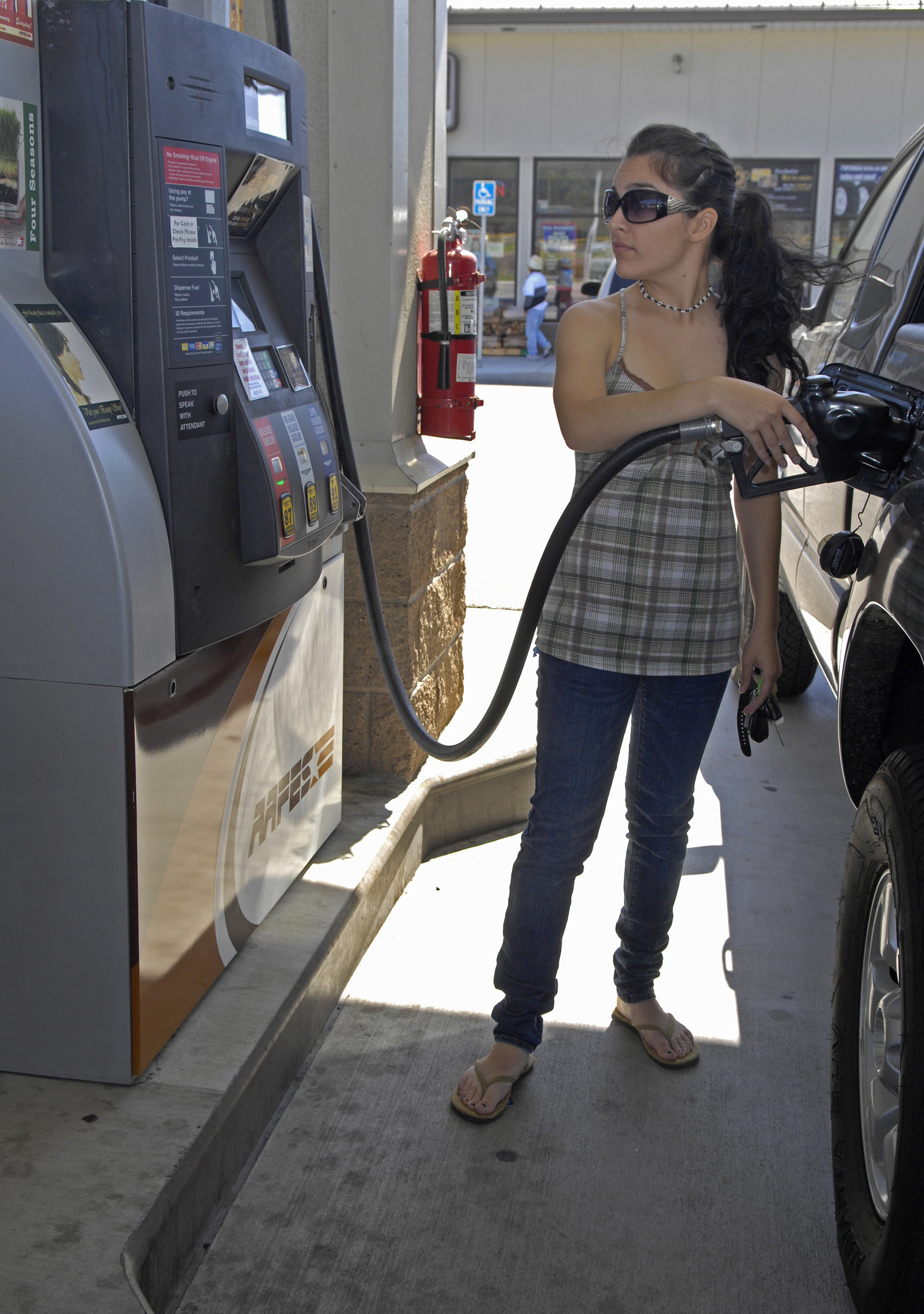
A consumer dispenses fuel into her own vehicle, a form of unpaid shadow work: after a century of relying on filling station attendants to dispense fuel in many countries, fuel companies can increasingly expect self-service as the norm.

Shadow work is a concept in economics identifying tasks performed by consumers, as a complement of industrial labor and services, as unpaid labor. It includes assembling of goods as components, self-checkout, and self-service at gas stations. This contrasts with the well-established view of unpaid labor done for self-subsistence or to give to others, encompassing all tasks individuals do without compensation.

The term was coined by Ivan Illich in his 1980 article and in his 1981 book of the same title.

Craig Lambert, a former editor of Harvard Magazine wrote about the new trend towards unpaid "shadow work" in 2011 and followed up his research in a book called Shadow Work: The Unpaid, Unseen Jobs That Fill Your Day in 2015. In it, he itemizes many of the unpaid tasks ordinary people do now that others used to do, such as pumping gasoline, bagging groceries, making travel arrangements, and checking in baggage at airports. He includes the rise of technology and robotics as forces leading to the growth of shadow work, and also includes such factors as crowdsourcing and parental over-engagement in their children's lives. He argues that shifting tasks to consumers takes away from their time and reduces the amount of casual social interaction in people's lives. It also limits the number of opportunities for low-skilled entry-level work (such as pumping gas).

== See also ==
- Carr–Benkler wager
- Internship
