= Emotion work =

Management of one's own feelings, or work done in an effort to maintain a relationship

Emotion work is a sociological concept that refers to the effort of trying to change, in degree or quality, an emotion or feeling; it is the work of changing one's feelings (such as by suppressing strong emotions) or displaying, evoking or producing other feelings. Emotion work may extend beyond management of one's own feelings to work done in an effort to maintain a relationship; there is dispute as to whether emotion work is only work done regulating one's own emotions, or extends to performing the emotional work for others.

== Hochschild ==
Arlie Russell Hochschild, who introduced the term in 1979, distinguished emotion work – unpaid emotional work that a person undertakes in private life – from emotional labor: emotional work done in a paid work setting. Emotion work occurs when people attempt to change their emotions or their emotional display for their own non-compensated benefit (e.g., in their interactions with family and friends). By contrast, emotional labor has exchange value because it is traded and performed for a wage.

In a later development, Hochschild distinguished between two broad types of emotion work, and among three techniques of emotion work. The two broad types involve evocation and suppression of emotion, while the three techniques of emotion work that Hochschild describes are cognitive, bodily and expressive.

However, the concept (if not the term) has been traced back as far as Aristotle: as Aristotle saw, the problem is not with emotionality, but with the appropriateness of emotion and its expression.

== Examples ==
One example of emotion work may involve a person with very strong feelings actively working to try to seem indifferent or neutral. One who is bored or uninterested might feign interest in a conversation. If someone breaks up with their partner, it takes a great deal of emotion work for that person to convince themselves that they no longer love their ex-partner and do not want to be with them anymore. This effort of trying to change one's own emotions, to like someone less, or to begin to see someone only as a friend despite feeling strong romantic feelings for them, is an example of emotion work.

Emotion work also involves the orientation of oneself or others to accord with accepted norms of emotional expression: emotion work is often performed by family members and friends, who put pressure on individuals to conform to emotional norms. Arguably, then, an individual's ultimate obeisance and/or resistance to aspects of emotion regimes are made visible in their emotion work.

Cultural norms often imply that emotion work is reserved for females. There is certainly evidence to the effect that the emotional management that women and men do is asymmetric; and that in general, women come into a marriage groomed for the role of emotional manager.

== Criticism ==
The social theorist Victor Jeleniewski Seidler argues that women's emotion work is merely another demonstration of false consciousness under patriarchy, and that emotion work, as a concept, has been adopted, adapted or criticized to such an extent that it is in danger of becoming a "catch-all-cliché".

More broadly, the concept of emotion work has itself been criticized as a wide over-simplification of mental processes such as repression and denial which continually occur in everyday life.

== Literary analogues ==
Rousseau in The New Heloise suggests that the attempt to master instrumentally one's affective life always results in a weakening and eventually the fragmentation of one's identity, even if the emotion work is performed at the demand of ethical principles.

== See also ==
- Hazing
- Bullying
- Affect display
- Peer pressure
- Toxic positivity
- Emotional labor
- Toxic workplace
- Cognitive dissonance
- Occupational burnout
- Fake it till you make it
- Emotional intelligence
- Emotional detachment
- Workplace harassment
- Emotional self-regulation
- Dissociation (psychology)
- Afterburn (psychotherapy)
- Marx's theory of alienation
- Face (sociological concept)
- Vocabularies of emotions
