= Reachback =

Reachback is a psychological term coined by Eric Berne. Reachback, in Berne's lexicon, is the period of time during which an impending event begins to influence an individual's behavior, including their level of stress.

== Berne's formulation ==
Berne, the founder of transactional analysis, coined the term in his book What Do You Say After You Say Hello?. He considered that reachback "is most dramatically seen in people with phobias whose whole functioning may be disturbed for days ahead at the prospect of getting into a feared situation, such as a medical examination or a journey."

For instance, a person expecting to take a trip on Monday starts getting irritable and worried on Friday. He may start trying to clear his overflowing inbox, cut short his evening relaxation, start preparing and packing for the trip, worry about what clothes to take, and so on. However, "for people who have unusual difficulties with anticipatory stress, the reach-back of an event such as a major vacation trip or a wedding may be several weeks."

Berne differentiates reachback from forward planning, which is done to mitigate negative effects such as reachback.

The flip side of reachback is afterburn, which is defined as the effect a past atypical event continues to have on a person's schedule, activities and mental state even after it is materially over. Berne considered that "each person has a sort of standard 'reachback time' and 'afterburn time' for various kinds of situations [...] domestic quarrels, examination or hearings, work deadlines, travel, visits from or to relatives, etc."

=== Prevention ===
Following William Osler's prescription for equable living day-by-day, Berne explained that "living day by day means living a well-planned and organized life, and sleeping well between each day, so that the day ends without reachback, since tomorrow is well planned, and begins without afterburn, since yesterday was well-organized".

== Defense usage ==
Reachback is also used in the US Department of Defense as the process of obtaining products, services, applications, forces, equipment, or material from organizations that are not forward deployed.

== See also ==
- Anticipation
- Stress management
