= Cognitive labor =

Unseen mental work mostly by women

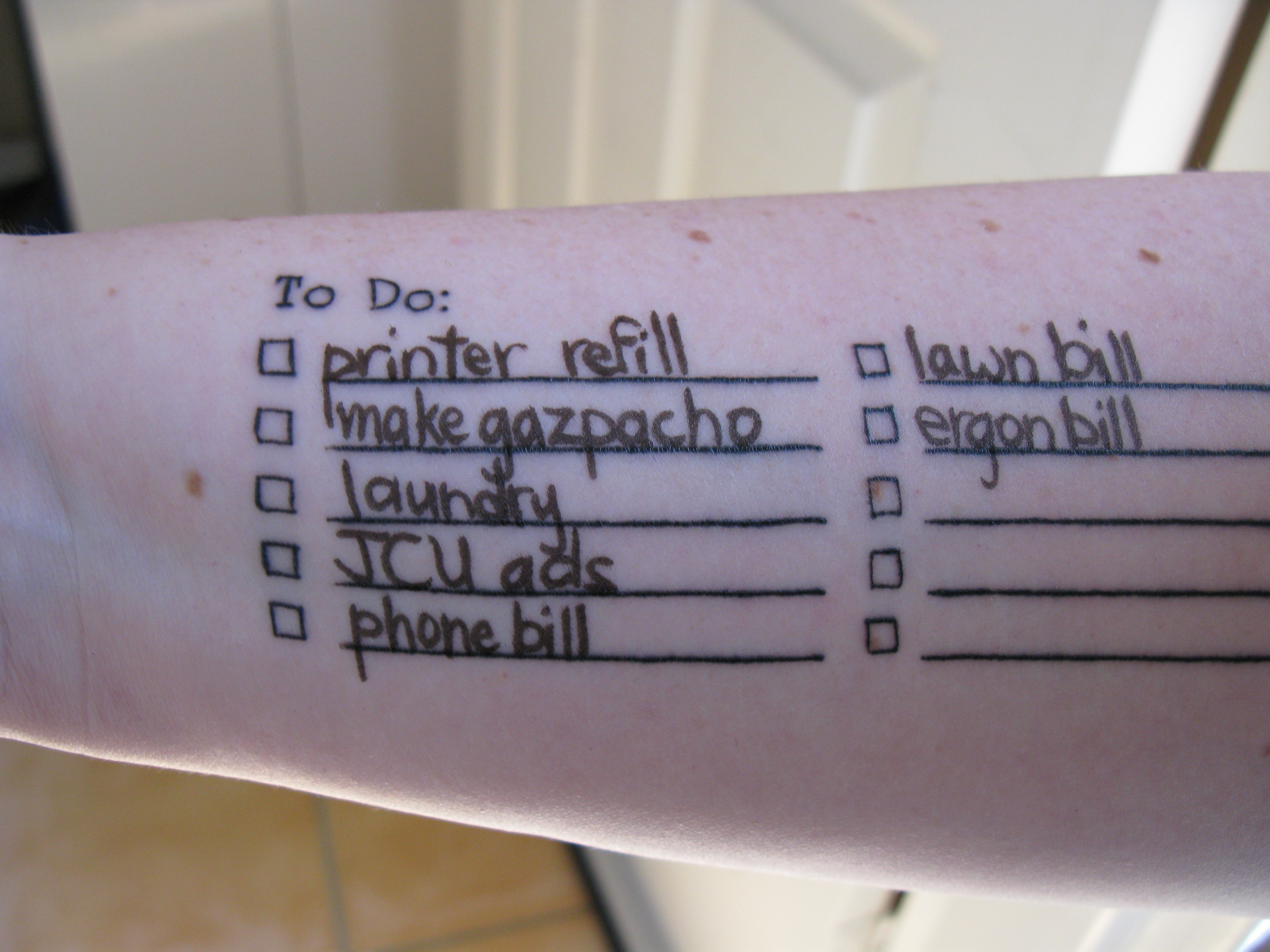
Cognitive labor is the mental planning, organizing, and scheduling side of invisible labor, done mostly by women.

Cognitive labor, or the third shift is a sociological and feminist concept referring to the invisible mental work many women do in relationships and families. The distribution of cognitive labor falls disproportionately on women, and it is related to invisible labor, emotional labor, and unpaid work while emphasizing the cost of planning, organizing, scheduling, managing and worrying, in addition to "executing." Handling the majority of cognitive labor is a burden that prevents women from pursuing opportunities or achieving greater health and happiness. A recommendation for balancing cognitive labor is making it more explicit and visible.

== Definitions ==
Cognitive labor has two key research articles that define this topic. The first is by Allison Daminger, who defined four key tasks for cognitive labor. Another is by Lindsay G. Robertson et al., which defined cognitive labor in terms of six major tasks.

=== Daminger's Definition ===
Daminger defines ''cognitive labor as a set of mental processes aimed at figuring out what the family requires, what it owes to others, and how best to ensure that both requirements and obligations are fulfilled''. The first task defined by Daminger is anticipation, characterized by looking ahead to anticipate future challenges. Second is identification, which involves researching current challenges to find solutions. The third is decisions, which include choosing between the prior research and knowledge to solve or mitigate current challenges. Finally, the fourth is monitoring, which assesses how prior decisions have addressed current challenges and whether further action is required. Lyn Craig, a sociology and social policy professor at the University of Melbourne, states, ''It's worthwhile to count the planning and organizing of the project management aspect that isn't evident when just asking people - what were you doing all day?.'' She notes that breaking down the steps Daminger identified prompts people to address that cognitive labor is real work that parents don't get credited for.

=== Robertson et al.'s Definition ===
The first task defined by Robertson et al. is planning and strategizing. This involves planning daily and future tasks, as well as planning when those tasks should be completed. The second task is monitoring and anticipating needs, which involves looking ahead to future needs and estimating their costs. The third task is meta-parenting, which is the thought behind parenting decisions and styles. The fourth is knowing, which includes both retaining and researching new information relevant to the family. The fifth task is managerial thinking, which involves managing and allocating both resources and family members to get tasks done. The sixth and final task is self-regulation, which involves changing thought processes and emotional regulation.

== Standardized scale of cognitive labor ==
Researching mental labor is difficult for a variety of reasons; however, the most important factor is how to define and measure something that is not seen or invisible. A research study by Julie Holiday Wayne et al. provides a scientifically validated scale for unseen labor. This research article aims to conduct a five-part study: defining, generating, reducing, and validating items, scale refinement and factor reliability, scale examination and criteria validation, and structure confirmation.

- Study 1: Defining Tasks of Cognitive Labor

This study surveyed adults and asked them what unseen housework they had done that week. The aim was to create a more inclusive list of tasks constituting cognitive labor. They concluded that cognitive labor has three main categories: managerial family load, cognitive family load, and emotional family load.

- Study 2: Generation, Reduction and Validation of Items

This study used the three main categories defined in study one to define overall descriptions of the tasks. The aim of this was to define the task of cognitive labor while keeping the defined tasks as inclusive as possible. These broad tasks were then used to create the first scale of cognitive labor.

- Study 3: Refinement of Scale

The third study aimed to interview a broad demographic of adults who had completed a minimum set of cognitive labor. They were then told to rate, on a 5-point scale, how many of the tasks defined in study two they had completed in the past month.

- Study 4: Scale and Criteria Examination

This study aimed to reduce the number of criteria to 22 of the defined tasks and determine whether the reduced scale provided sufficient variation in point scaling.

- Study 5: Structure Confirmation

The overall goal of the final study was to test the validity of this scale through verification and confirmation of repeated surveys and other defined methods of cognitive labor. This validation and verification yielded a 9-item scale. This scale was then tested, and similar results to those in past research were observed: women do more of the cognitive labor than men.

== Effects on quality of life ==
An academic review paper by Dean L., Churchill B., and Ruppanner L. aimed to review multiple research articles to conclude the effects of cognitive labor. This paper found that cognitive labor is taxing due to its overall nature. They found that Cognitive labor is simply worrying about and helping loved ones; as a result, it is an unending form of labor. However, due to a lack of long-term research on this topic, they could not pinpoint any mental or physical health effects of this labor. Another research study by Julie Holiday Wayne et al. found that when people were surveyed, the main word associated with cognitive labor was 'worry,' and that this worry was not associated with any particular personality type. They also found that burnout and overall feelings of exhaustion were associated with cognitive labor and emotional load.

== Gendered distribution and effects ==
Daminger found that mothers were consistently more active across all four stages, particularly in anticipation and monitoring, though fathers were most active in decision-making. A study done on cognitive household labor was conducted to observe whether mental load was gendered. The results show that cognitive labor fell upon women, whereas physical labor was more commonly dispersed between the two partners. The study found that cognitive labor is strongly associated with women's depression, stress, burnout, relationship functioning, and mental health.

== Cognitive labor and COVID-19 ==
A review article by Richard J. Petts and Daniel L. Carlson aimed to determine the effect of COVID-19 on gender disparities in parental cognitive labor. The results of these surveys found that, on average, women performed 5 hours of cognitive labor per week, compared with fathers who performed 2 hours. The results of this survey found two main points: the first is that the amount of cognitive labor women did was related to mental distress. The second was that when fathers did more cognitive labor, mothers' mental distress decreased. Suggesting that increased cognitive workload due to the pandemic negatively affected the mental state of mothers.

== Application to Women in Sports ==
Beyond domestic and family settings, cognitive labor and the third shift are heavily prevalent in Women's sports. Women athletes frequently shoulder disproportionate invisible mental work compared to their male counterparts, including navigating systemic underfunding, self-advocating for equal pay and resources, coordinating media representation, and managing the psychological burden of gender bias in athletics (Pascoe et al., 2022). This extra layer of strategic planning and advocacy functions as an uncompensated mental load that can exacerbate burnout and hinder athletic longevity. Making these administrative and emotional demands explicit is a crucial step toward achieving true equity in sports organizations and institutions.
