= Postponement of affect =

Defence mechanism used against feelings or emotions

Postponement of affect is a defence mechanism which may be used against a variety of feelings or emotions. Such a "temporal displacement, resulting simply in a later appearance of the affect reaction and in thus preventing the recognition of the motivating connection, is most frequently used against the effects of rage (or annoyance) and grief".

== Negative postponement: repression ==
=== Grief ===
In the effect of grief, postponement seems to be an essential component. What happens in mourning is nothing other than a gradual "working-through" of an affect which, if released in its full strength, would overwhelm the ego'. John Bowlby considered the first of the "four phases of mourning" to be a 'Phase of numbness that...may be interrupted by outbursts of extremely intense distress and/or anger'. Thus one can speak of 'a rather typical postponement of grief': '"I feel hurt about something and then automatically this kind of shields things up and then I feel like I can't really touch or feel anything very much"...postponement...[of] the weepiness'.

Conversely, Eric Lindemann, describing 'the symptomatology and management of acute grief following the Coconut Grove night-club fire...showed that people who do not "break down" and express feelings appropriate to a bereavement may suffer from delayed or distorted grief'.

=== Fright ===
Investigation of 'the reaction of the ego to acute mortal danger...repeatedly found an absence of fear during the period of acute danger, but a subsequent appearance of acute fear when the danger was past'. This may be a contributing factor in post-traumatic stress disorder, where the sufferer may be 'the victim...of a blocked fear tension...he hadn't had the time to feel the fear'.

'The postponement of fright is so well known to movie writers that it is not only frequently used but also designated by a special term: double-take'.

=== Guilt ===
Defence against guilt feelings may involve people using postponement by way of 'an isolation of guilt feeling...they do things without any guilt feeling, and experience an exaggerated feeling of guilt on some other occasion without being aware of the connection'. Such postponement can be linked to Nietzsche's concept of the "pale criminal" or 'neurotic immoralist...the "pale felon" who does not live up to his acts' – retrospective guilt: 'he was equal to his deed when he did it; but he could not bear its image after it was done...now the lead of his guilt lies upon him'.

A similar postponement of guilt may be seen in everyday life, as when 'a woman may decide that her Superego will permit her to cheat on her spouse...[but] may begin to feel guilty many years afterwards.

In pathological form something similar would seem to occur 'during a melancholic attack', or so Freud surmised: the 'super-ego becomes over-severe, abuses the poor ego...reproaches it for actions in the remotest past which had been taken lightly at the time – as though it had spent the whole interval in collecting accusations and had only been waiting for its current access of strength in order to bring them up'.

Conversely, 'people who can muster the courage to face up to their guilt...will not suffer as long from the agony of the cognitive rehearsal of the guilt situation as people who postpone facing up to their guilt'.

== Positive postponement: suppression ==
Freud saw the development of the reality principle as a process which 'demands and carries into effect the postponement of satisfaction...and the temporary toleration of unpleasure as a step on the long indirect road to pleasure'. Such impulse control has been seen as a key component in emotional intelligence. 'The ability to delay gratification contributes powerfully to intellectual potential quite apart from IQ itself', while what has been called '"goal-directed self-imposed delay of gratification" is perhaps the essence of emotional self-regulation: the ability to deny impulse in the service of a goal'.

Similarly, among the defence mechanisms, as part of 'the mature ways of dealing with real stress...there's suppression – instead of repressing a frightening feeling and pushing it right out of awareness, you hold it in check and bear the discomfort of feeling it. That means you are more likely to be able to work out how to handle it, given a bit of time'. In this sense, 'delaying, as opposed to avoidance, is a fine mechanism, another form of the method of learning I call step-by-step'.

== See also ==
- Afterburn
- Deferred obedience
- George Eman Vaillant
- Grief counseling
- Guilt
- Procrastination
- Thought suppression
