= Gunnysacking =

Metaphor in interpersonal conflict

Gunnysacking is when someone silently collects irritations and slights until "the last straw is placed on them" causing an overblown reaction. The term derives from the gunny sack, a cloth container used for carrying or storing things.

Gunnysacking has been described as "an alienating fight tactic in which a person saves up, or gunnysacks, grievances until the sack gets too heavy and bursts, and old hostilities pour out".

== Stonewalling ==
Gunnysacking is used in conflict resolution, referring to the act of "storing up" grievances acquired in the course of a relationship without systematically resolving them. "When grievances simmer, they build and build in intensity until there's an explosion; when they are aired and worked out, it takes the pressure off".

The related practice of "stonewalling may encourage one's partner to engage in 'gunnysacking' – keeping one's grievances secret while tossing them into an imaginary gunnysack, which grows heavier and heavier over time".

== Kitchen-sinking ==
The term may alternately refer to the act of verbally bringing up past grievances (i.e. dumping the contents of the sack) during the process of trying to resolve some present problem in a relationship – "gunnysacking or bringing in everything but the kitchen sink". In which case, gunnysacking (as a tactic) has the dual effect of raising additional problems (in what is typically already a volatile situation) and presenting an obstacle to dealing with the current issues. Once the practice becomes a familiar pattern used by one person in a relationship, other people may avoid reporting new issues or problems for the sake of avoiding a repeat of the gunnysacking behavior. "Couples who engage in patterns of negative reciprocity, such as joint gunnysacking and sequences of complaints followed by countercomplaints, report less relational satisfaction". By contrast, "constructive fighting aims at resolving specific problems that are happening now – not at gunnysacking".

== See also ==
- "Hurricane Neddy", an example of gunnysacking in popular culture
- Relationship counselling
