= Lilly Irani =

American academic

Lilly Christine Irani is an Iranian-American academic whose research spans topics in computer science, communication studies, feminist studies, entrepreneurship, and microwork. She is a professor in the Department of Communication at the University of California, San Diego. She specializes in cultural politics of high-tech work in the South Asian development and focuses on how actors create innovation cultures.

== Education and career ==
Irani graduated in 2004 from Stanford University with both a bachelor's degree in Computer science with honors in the Science, Technology, and Society program and a master's degree in computer science, specializing in human-computer interaction. After working in user interface design at Google from 2003 to 2007, she returned to graduate school, completing a Ph.D. in informatics at the University of California, Irvine in 2013. Her dissertation, Designing Citizens in Transnational India, was supervised by Paul Dourish.

She joined the University of California, San Diego faculty as an assistant professor of communications in 2013, and was tenured as an associate professor in 2019. In 2023, she became the inaugural Faculty Director of the UC San Diego Labor Center. In 2025, she received a UC San Diego Convene and Influence Award and co-led a project examining the impact of AI on workers with the Labor Center’s executive director, Satomi Rash-Zeigler. "She also serves as faculty in the Design Lab, Institute for practical Ethics, the program in Critical Gender Studies, and sits on the Academic Advisory Board of AI Now (NYU)."

== Selected publications ==
Irani is the author of the book Chasing Innovation: Making Entrepreneurial Citizens in Modern India (Princeton University Press, 2019), which won the 2019 Diana Forsythe Prize for Science, Technology, Engineering, or Medicine of the American Anthropological Association as well as the 2020 Outstanding Book Award of the International Communication Association. She is also the coauthor, with Jesse Marx, of the book Redacted (Taller California Books, 2021).

Her journal and conference papers include:

- Irani, Lilly; Vertesi, Janet; Dourish, Paul; Philip, Kavita; Grinter, Rebecca E. (2010), "Postcolonial computing: a lens on design and development", in Mynatt, Elizabeth D.; Schoner, Don; Fitzpatrick, Geraldine; Hudson, Scott E.; Edwards, W. Keith; Rodden, Tom (eds.), Proceedings of the 28th International Conference on Human Factors in Computing Systems, CHI 2010, Atlanta, Georgia, USA, April 10-15, 2010, ACM, pp. 1311–1320, doi:10.1145/1753326.1753522, S2CID 3128663
- Ross, Joel; Irani, Lilly; Silberman, M. Six; Zaldivar, Andrew; Tomlinson, Bill (2010), "Who are the crowdworkers?: shifting demographics in mechanical turk", in Mynatt, Elizabeth D.; Schoner, Don; Fitzpatrick, Geraldine; Hudson, Scott E.; Edwards, W. Keith; Rodden, Tom (eds.), Proceedings of the 28th International Conference on Human Factors in Computing Systems, CHI 2010, Extended Abstracts Volume, Atlanta, Georgia, USA, April 10-15, 2010, ACM, pp. 2863–2872, doi:10.1145/1753846.1753873, S2CID 11386257
- Irani, Lilly; Silberman, M. Six (2013), "Turkopticon: interrupting worker invisibility in Amazon Mechanical Turk", in Mackay, Wendy E.; Brewster, Stephen A.; Bødker, Susanne (eds.), 2013 ACM SIGCHI Conference on Human Factors in Computing Systems, CHI '13, Paris, France, April 27 - May 2, 2013 (PDF), ACM, pp. 611–620, doi:10.1145/2470654.2470742, S2CID 207203679
- Irani, Lilly (2015), "The cultural work of microwork", New Media Soc., 17 (5): 720–739, doi:10.1177/1461444813511926, S2CID 377594
- Irani, L. (2018). “Design Thinking”: Defending Silicon Valley at the Apex of Global Labor Hierarchies. Catalyst : Feminism, Theory, Technoscience, 4(1)https://doi.org/10.28968/cftt.v4i1.29638
- Huber, Linda, et al. From Tech Lash to Tech Fash: Strategic Reflections on a Decade of Collective Organizing in Computing. 18 Aug. 2025, pp. 1–4, https://doi.org/10.1145/3737609.3747097
