= Afterburn (psychotherapy) =

Period of time before a past event is assimilated

Afterburn is a psychological term coined by Eric Berne, who defined it as "the period of time before a past event is assimilated".

== Berne's formulation ==
Eric Berne, the founding father of transactional analysis, used the term "afterburn" to indicate the effect an atypical past event continues to exert on a person's daily schedule, activities and mental state even after it is over: to "those occasions when it disturbs normal patterns for an appreciable period, rather than being assimilated into them or excluded from them by repression and other psychological mechanisms".

For Berne, afterburn is the flip side of reachback, which is the effect that the event, thanks to the stress of anticipation, has on the person's life before it. He considered that "in most cases one or the other can be tolerated without serious consequences. It can be dangerous for almost anyone, however, if the after-burn of the last event overlaps with the reach-back from the next ... this is a good definition of overwork".

=== Remedies ===
Berne considered that "dreaming is probably the normal mechanism for adjusting after-burn and reach-back", but that sex and holidays were also useful remedies. "Most normal after-burns and reach-backs run their courses in about six days, so that a two-week vacation allows the superficial after-burns to burn out, after which there are a few days of carefree living. ...For the assimilation of more chronic after-burns and deeper, repressed reach-backs, however, a vacation of at least six weeks is probably necessary."

== Other views ==
In terms of exam stress management, "afterburn is the time needed after the exam to... set it to rest", a period of "afterburn time... [with] a host of unexpressed feelings and incomplete tasks".

"Referring to soldiers recently returned from Iraq, Sara Corbett described this type of delayed reaction as 'psychological afterburn'... [quoting soldiers who spoke of it to the effect of:] 'My body's here, but my mind is there.'"

With respect to therapy, some consider that "you are not ending well when you find that you are thinking about the person's problems after sessions. This is called afterburn". Others however see opportunity in such occasions: "You're sorting out your countertransference, you're owning your projections, you're separating out you from the family"—in short, one is usefully employing "those lagging emotions that afterburn following a session".

=== Goffman ===
Erving Goffman has a related but rather different usage of the term "to refer to a sotto voce comment, one meant not to be a ratified part of an encounter, an afterburn ... a remonstrance conveyed collusively by virtue of the fact that its targets are in the process of leaving the field".

== See also ==
- Fugue state
- Future shock
- Gunnysacking
- Psychological trauma
