= Filling station attendant =

Worker at a vehicle filling station

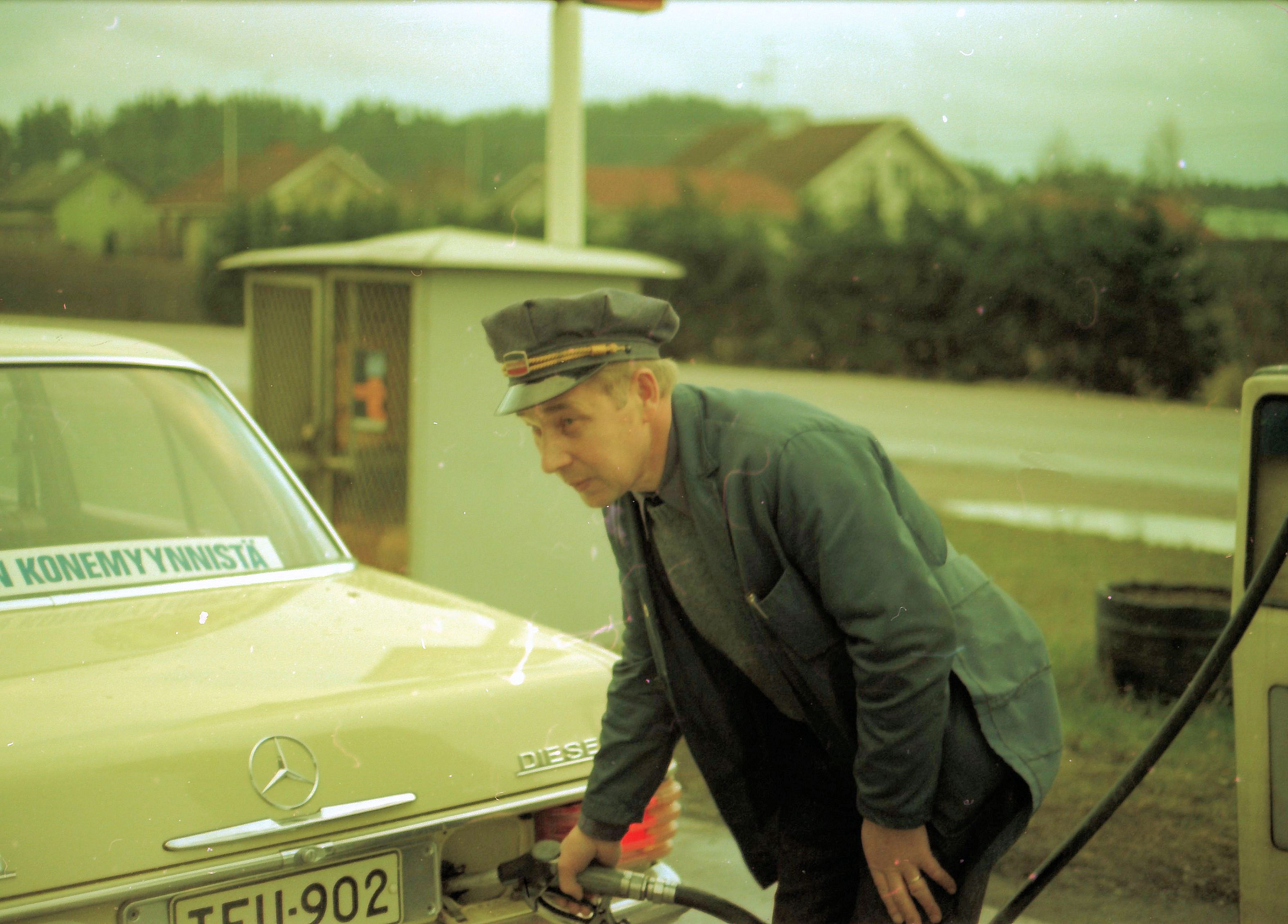
Fueling up at a Union gas station in Salo, Finland in the 1990s

A filling station attendant or gas station attendant (also known as a gas jockey in the US and Canada) is a worker at a full-service filling station who performs services other than accepting payment. Tasks usually include pumping fuel, cleaning windshields, and checking vehicle oil levels. Prior to the introduction of self-starting vehicle engines, attendants would also start vehicle engines by manually turning the crankshaft with a hand crank.

In the United States, gas jockeys were often tipped for their services, but this is now rare as full-service stations are uncommon except in New Jersey, 16 “urban” counties in Oregon, 4 cities in Massachusetts, and the town of Huntington, New York, where there are laws or restrictions against letting customers pump their own gasoline.

Filling station attendants are still employed at gas stations in many countries. In Finland, for example, filling station attendants are currently only used at Shell's service stations.

== History ==
Early filling stations were usually located at general stores, where gasoline would be put in buckets and funneled into vehicles. Most early stations were little more than a manually powered roadside pump operated by an attendant.

=== Decline ===
In the 1970s, two periods of gasoline shortages (1973 and 1979) caused higher fuel prices which in turn resulted in permanent closure of many full-service gas stations as consumers looked for pricing relief.

=== Current status ===
In most western countries today, full-service stations and their attendants are not common and are usually considered somewhat nostalgic.

==== United States ====
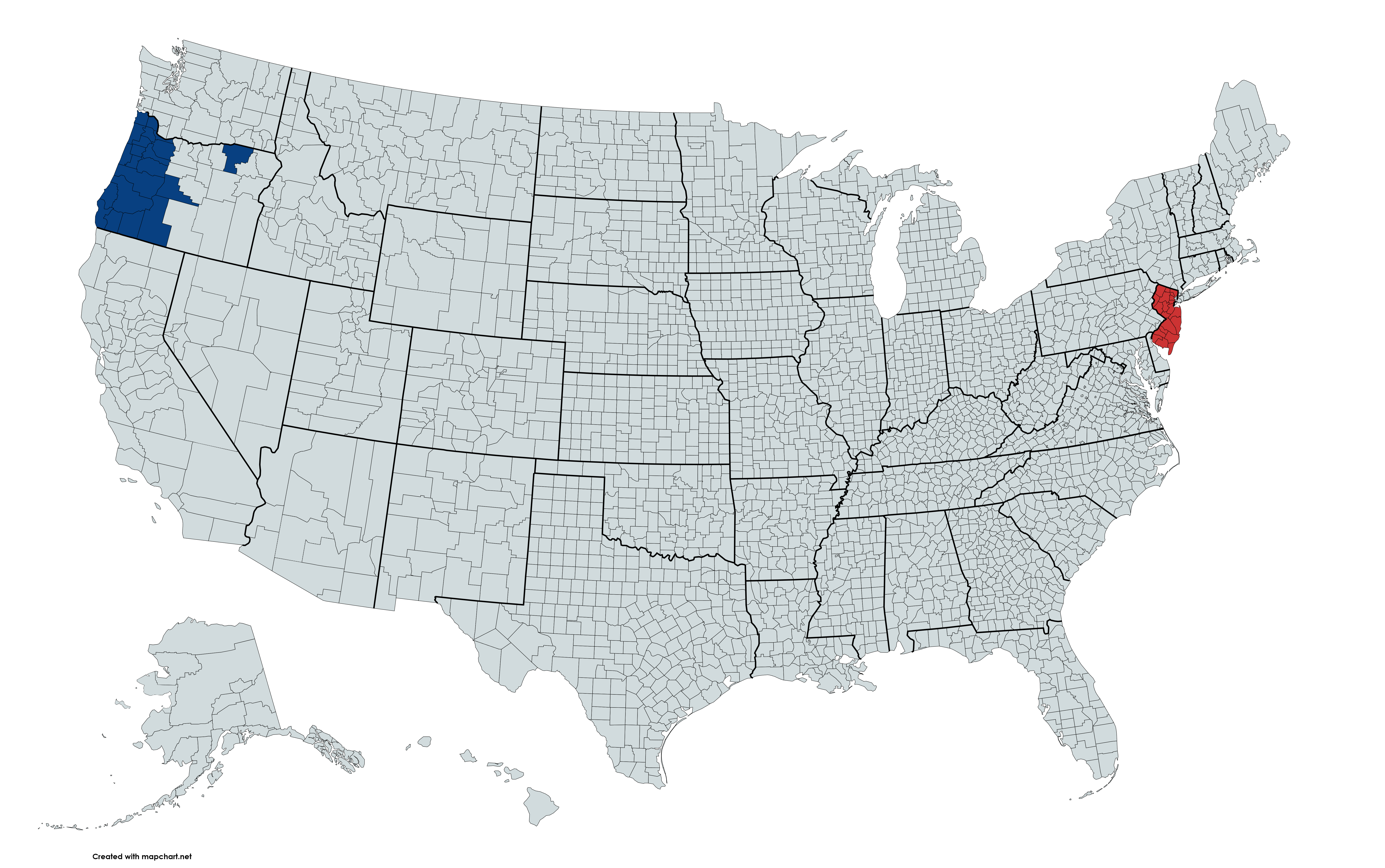
Areas in red prohibit self-serve. Areas in blue require full-serve but permit stations to allow self-serve.

In New Jersey self-service fuel filling is illegal. It was banned in 1949 after lobbying by service station owners. Service stations only offer full service and "mini service". Proponents of the ban cite safety and jobs as reasons to keep the ban.

The State of Oregon banned self-service in 1951, but legalised it from 2018 in counties with 40,000 residents or fewer. In 2020, as a response to the COVID-19 pandemic Oregon temporarily allowed self-service statewide. In August 2023, Oregon allowed filling stations to provide a self-serve option to customers, up to half their pumps. Counties regarded as "rural" under the bill are not required to have attendants while those regarded as "urban" are required to maintain at least one attendant per station. The rural counties in Oregon under HB 2426 (2023) are the following: Baker, Clatsop, Crook, Curry, Gilliam, Grant, Harney, Hood River, Jefferson, Klamath, Lake, Malheur, Morrow, Sherman, Tillamook, Umatilla, Union, Wallowa, Wasco, and Wheeler.

In the towns of Huntington, New York and the Massachusetts towns of Weymouth, Arlington, Upton, and Milford, self-service gas stations are illegal, with all gas stations being full-service.

==== Brazil ====
In Brazil, self-service fuel filling is illegal, due to a federal law enacted in 2000. The bill was proposed by Federal Deputy Aldo Rebelo, who claims it saved 300,000 fuel attendant jobs across the country.

==== Morocco ====
An attendant cleaning a car's windscreen at a Petrom (Morocco) filling station in Casablanca, 2026

In Morocco, filling stations generally do not operate on a self-service basis: an attendant fills the tank for the customer, who states the type of fuel and the amount required. Attendants may also clean the windscreen, and a small tip is customary.

==== South Africa ====
In South Africa, self-service fuel filling is illegal. Concerns include job losses and the danger of drivers leaving their car, leaving them vulnerable to attacks by criminals.

== See also ==
- Fuel dispenser
