= Emotional labor =

Work managing feelings and expressions

Emotional labor is the act of managing one's own emotions and the emotions of others to meet job expectations. It requires the capacity to manage and produce a feeling to fulfill the emotional requirements of a job. More specifically, workers are expected to regulate their personas during interactions with customers, co-workers, clients, and managers. This includes analysis and decision-making in terms of the expression of emotion, whether actually felt or not, as well as its opposite: the suppression of emotions that are felt but not expressed. This is done so as to produce a certain feeling in the customer or client that will allow the company or organization to succeed.

Roles that have been identified as requiring emotional labor include those involved in education, public administration, law, childcare, health care, social work, hospitality, media, advocacy, aviation and espionage.

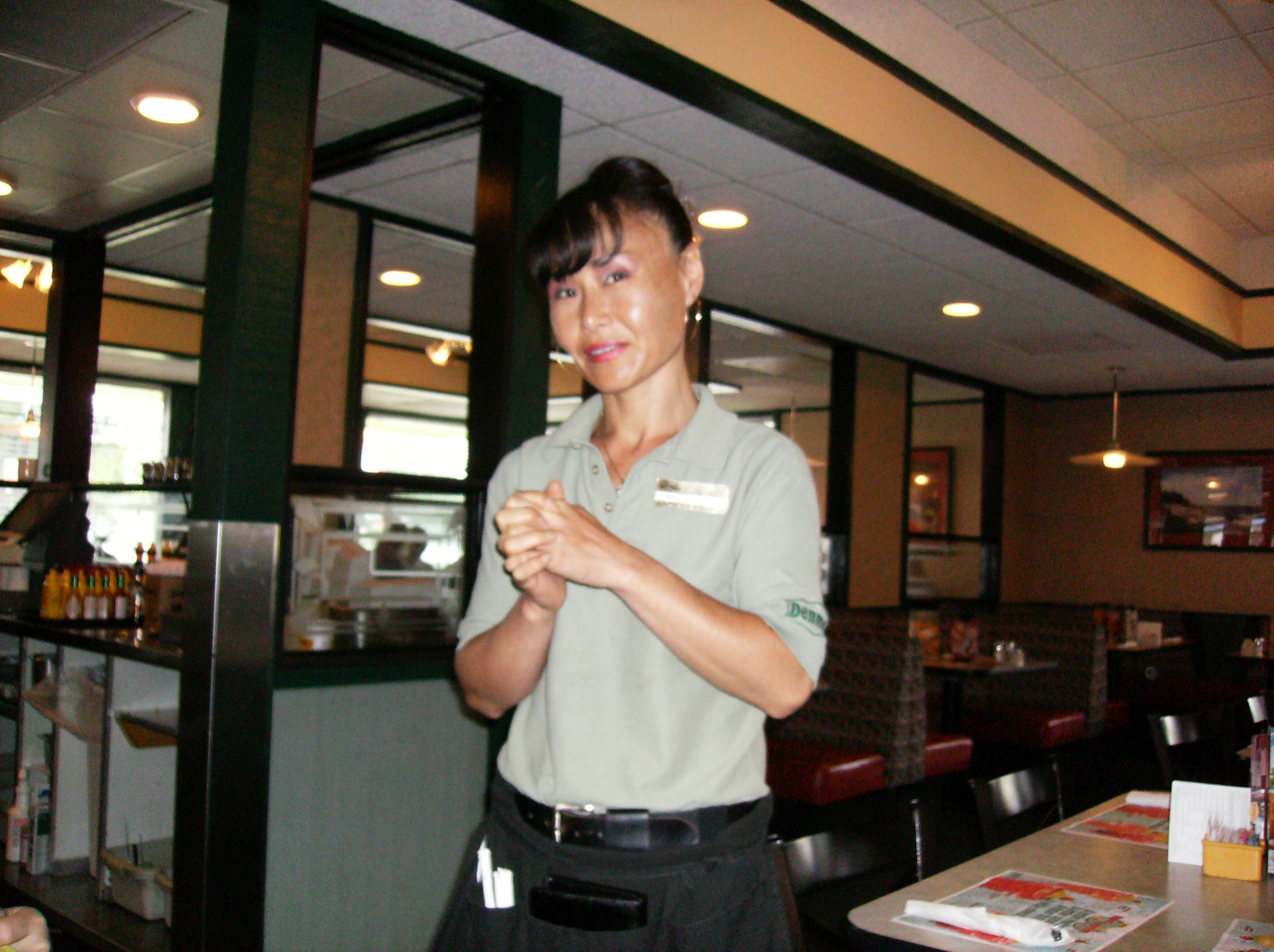
A waitress at a restaurant is expected to do emotional labor, such as smiling and expressing positive emotion towards customers

The sociologist Arlie Hochschild provided the first definition of emotional labor, which is displaying certain emotions to meet the requirements of a job. The related term emotion work refers to displaying emotions you don't feel within the private sphere of one's home or interactions with family and friends. Hochschild identified three emotion regulation strategies: cognitive, bodily, and expressive. Within cognitive emotion work, one attempts to change images, ideas, or thoughts in hopes of changing the feelings associated with them. For example, one may associate a family picture with feeling happy and think about said picture whenever attempting to feel happy. Within bodily emotion work, one attempts to change physical symptoms in order to create a desired emotion. For example, one may attempt deep breathing in order to reduce anger. Within expressive emotion work, one attempts to change expressive gestures to change inner feelings, such as smiling when trying to feel happy.

While emotion work happens within the private sphere, emotional labor is emotion management within the workplace according to employer expectations. Jobs involving emotional labor are defined as those that:

1. require face-to-face or voice-to-voice contact with the public.
2. require the worker to produce an emotional state in another person.
3. allow the employer, through training and supervision, to exercise a degree of control over the emotional activities of employees.

Hochschild (1983) argues that within this commodification process, service workers are estranged from their own feelings in the workplace.

== Alternate usage ==
The term has been applied in modern contexts to refer to household tasks, specifically unpaid labor that is often expected of women, e.g. having to remind their partner of chores. The term can also refer to informal counseling, such as providing advice to a friend or helping someone through a breakup. When Hochschild was interviewed about this shifting usage, she described it having undergone concept creep, expressing that it made the concept blurrier and was sometimes being applied to things that were simply just labor, although how carrying out this labor made a person feel could make it emotional labor as well.

== Determinants ==
1. Societal, occupational, and organizational norms. For example, empirical evidence indicates that in typically "busy" stores there is more legitimacy to express negative emotions than there is in typically "slow" stores, in which employees are expected to behave in accordance with the display rules. Hence, the emotional culture to which one belongs influences the employee's commitment to those rules.
2. Dispositional traits and inner feeling on the job; such as employees' emotional expressiveness, which refers to the capability to use facial expressions, voice, gestures, and body movements to transmit emotions; or employees' level of career identity (the importance of the career role to self-identity), which allows them to express the organizationally-desired emotions more easily (because there is less discrepancy between expressed behavior and emotional experience when engaged in their work).
3. Supervisory regulation of display rules; Supervisors are likely to be important definers of display rules at the job level, given their direct influence on workers' beliefs about high-performance expectations. Moreover, supervisors' impressions of the need to suppress negative emotions on the job influence the employees' impressions of that display rule.

== Surface and deep acting ==
Arlie Hochschild's foundational text divided emotional labor into two components: surface acting and deep acting. Surface acting occurs when employees display the emotions required for a job without changing how they actually feel. Deep acting is an effortful process through which employees change their internal feelings to align with organizational expectations, producing more natural and genuine emotional displays. Although the underlying processes differ, the objective of both is typically to show positive emotions, which are presumed to impact the feelings of customers and bottom-line outcomes (e.g. sales, positive recommendations, and repeat business). However, research generally has shown surface acting is more harmful to employee health. Without a consideration of ethical values, the consequences of emotional work on employees can easily become negative. Business ethics can be used as a guide for employees on how to present feelings that are consistent with ethical values, and can show them how to regulate their feelings more easily and comfortably while working.

== Careers ==
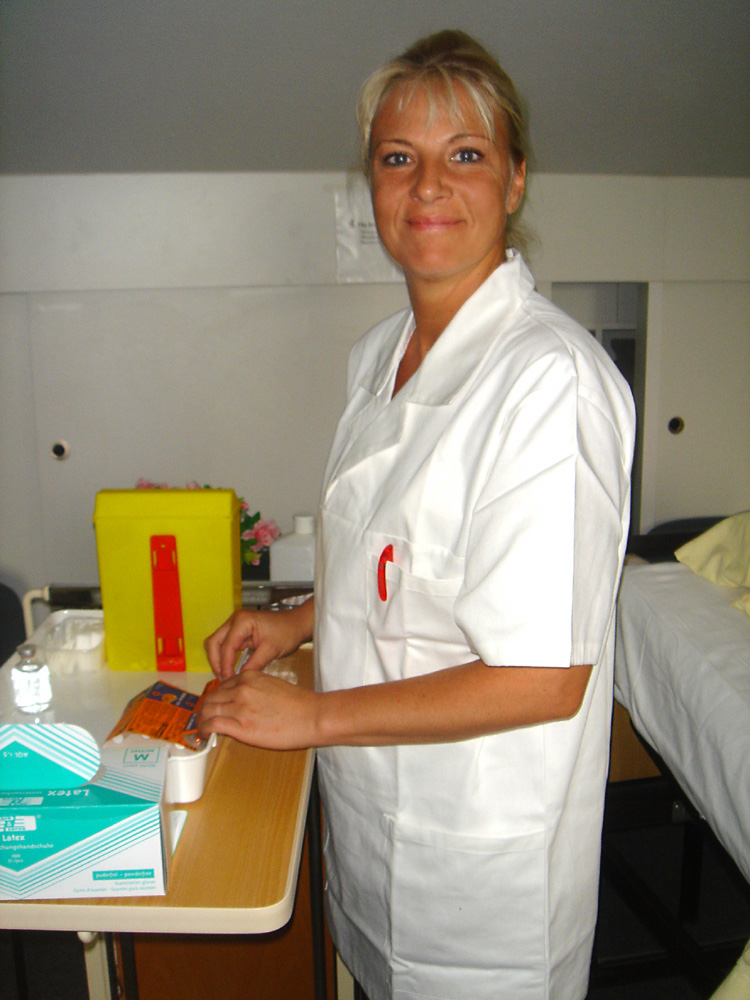
A nurse working in a hospital is expected to express positive emotions towards patients, such as warmth and compassion.

In the past, emotional labor demands and display rules were viewed as a characteristic of particular occupations, such as restaurant workers, cashiers, hospital workers, bill collectors, counselors, secretaries, and nurses. However, display rules have been conceptualized not only as role requirements of particular occupational groups, but also as interpersonal job demands, which are shared by many kinds of occupations.

=== Teachers ===
Zhang et al. (2019) looked at teachers in China, using questionnaires the researchers asked about their teaching experience and their interaction with the children and their families. According to numerous studies, early childhood education is important to a child's development, which can have an effect on the amount of emotional labor a teacher must perform, and that the teacher's emotional labor has an effect on the children. Zhang et al. (2019) found that surface acting was used significantly less than deep and natural acting in kindergarten teachers, and that early childhood teachers were less likely to fake or suppress their feelings. They also found that more experienced teachers had higher levels of emotional labor, because they either had more skills to suppress their emotions, or they are less driven to use surface acting.

=== Bill collectors ===
In 1991, Sutton did an in-depth qualitative study into bill collectors at a collection agency. He found that unlike the other jobs described here where employees need to act cheerful and concerned, bill collectors are selected and socialized to show irritation to most debtors. Specifically, the collection agency hired agents who seemed to be easily aroused. The newly hired agents were then trained on when and how to show varying emotions to different types of debtors. As they worked at the collection agency, they were closely monitored by their supervisors to make sure that they frequently conveyed urgency to debtors.

Bill collectors' emotional labor consists of not letting angry and hostile debtors make them angry and to not feel guilty about pressuring friendly debtors for money. They coped with angry debtors by publicly showing their anger or making jokes when they got off the phone. They minimized the guilt they felt by staying emotionally detached from the debtors.

=== Childcare workers ===
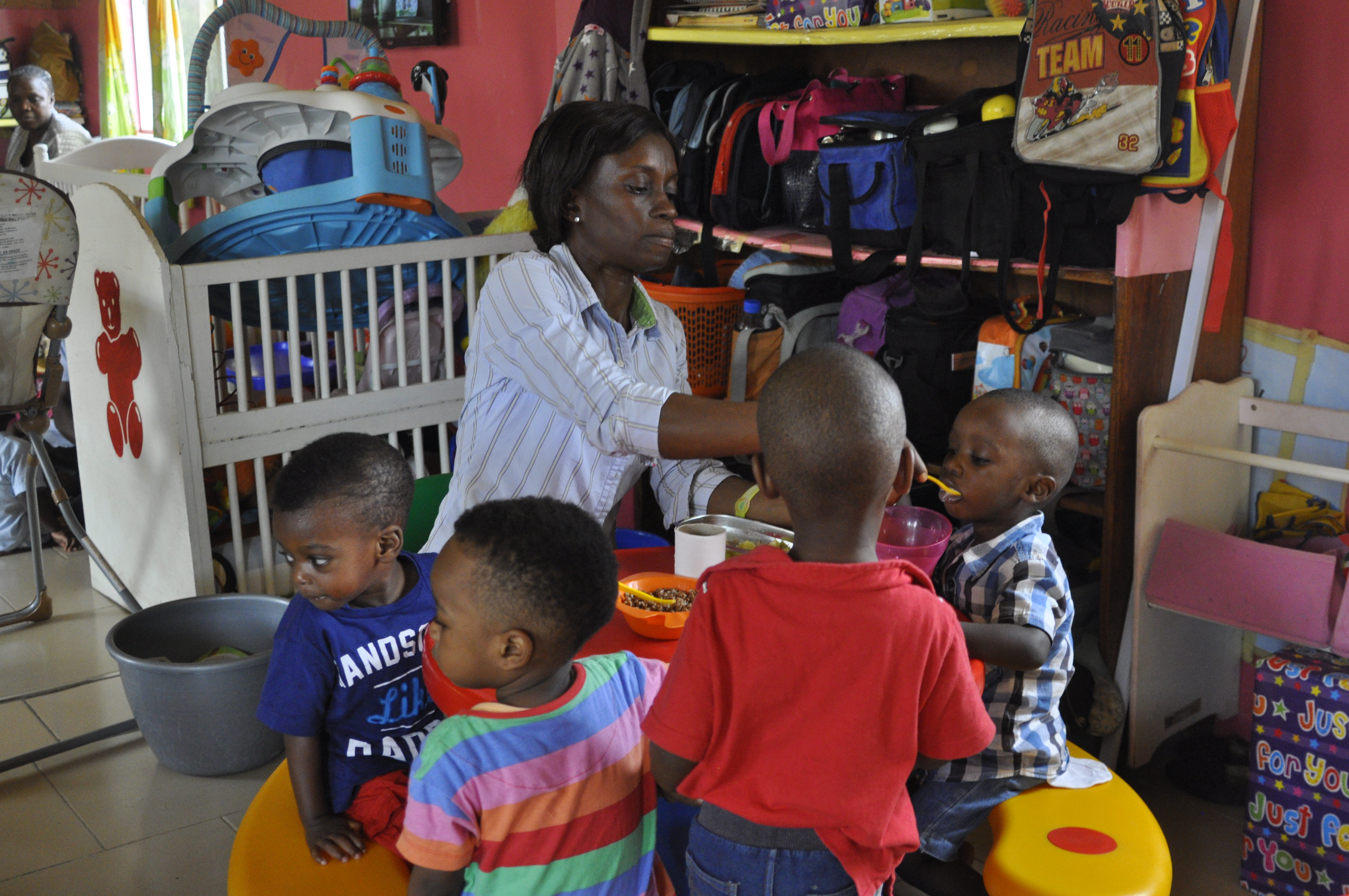
Childcare worker at a daycare in Nigeria

The skills involved in childcare are often viewed as innate to women, making the components of childcare invisible. However, a number of scholars have not only studied the difficulty and skill required for childcare, but also suggested that the emotional labor of childcare is unique and needs to be studied differently. Performing emotional labor requires the development of emotional capital, and that can only be developed through experience and reflection. Through semi-structured interviews, Edwards (2016) found that there were two components of emotional labor in childcare in addition to Hochschild's original two: emotional consonance and suppression. Edwards (2016) defined suppression as hiding emotion and emotional consonance as naturally experiencing the same emotion that one is expected to feel for the job.

=== Nursing and care workers ===
Emotional Labour demands are high in nursing professions, with compassion being a core component to the provision of patient-centred care and nurses being key individuals responsible for the shift towards patient-centred care. There is clear evidence that emotional labour can be of great benefit to both the caregiver and recipient and although many nurses find the profession deeply rewarding, over 65% report experiencing high levels of stress and burnout and a further study of 43,026 participants revealed a burnout rate of 56.0% for nurses, 54.1% for other clinical staff and 45.6% in non-clinical healthcare workers and compassion fatigue being highly prevalent in the field Caring for patients with additional needs may be paid or unpaid labour with carers and family members of the patients often also experiencing a high degree of fatigue and emotional labour expenditure often leading to social isolation and implications for their own health.

=== Food-industry workers ===
==== Wait staff ====
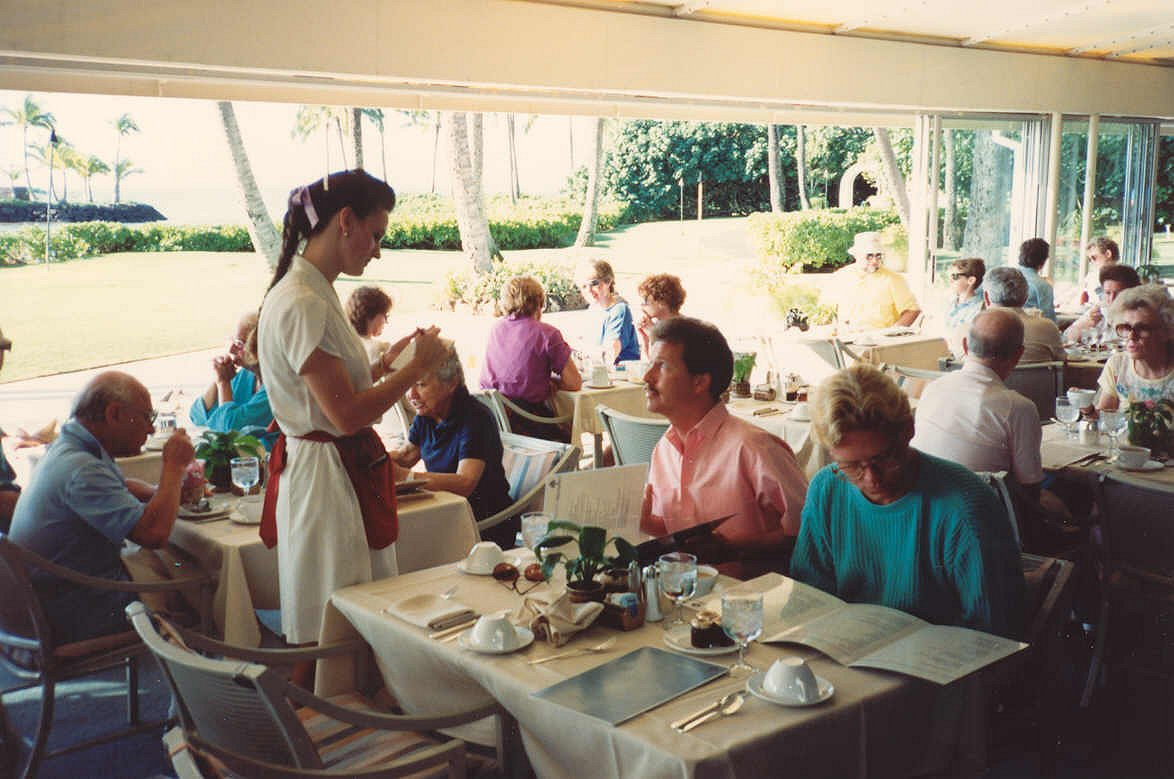
A waitress taking an order in an American restaurant

In her 1991 study of waitresses in Philadelphia, Paules examines how these workers assert control and protect their self-identity during interactions with customers. In restaurant work, Paules argues, workers' subordination to customers is reinforced through "cultural symbols that originate from deeply rooted assumptions about service work." Because the waitresses were not strictly regulated by their employers, waitresses' interactions with customers were controlled by the waitresses themselves. Although they are stigmatized by the stereotypes and assumptions of servitude surrounding restaurant work, the waitresses studied were not negatively affected by their interactions with customers. To the contrary, they viewed their ability to manage their emotions as a valuable skill that could be used to gain control over customers. Thus, the Philadelphia waitresses took advantage of the lack of employer-regulated emotional labor in order to avoid the potentially negative consequences of emotional labor.

Though Paules highlights the positive consequences of emotional labor for a specific population of waitresses, other scholars have also found negative consequences of emotional labor within the waitressing industry. Through eighteen months of participant observation research, Bayard De Volo (2003) found that casino waitresses are highly monitored and monetarily bribed to perform emotional labor in the workplace. Specifically, Bayard De Volo (2003) argues that through a sexualized environment and a generous tipping system, both casino owners and customers control waitresses' behavior and appearance for their own benefit and pleasure. Even though the waitresses have their own forms of individual and collective resistance mechanisms, intense and consistent monitoring of their actions by casino management makes it difficult to change the power dynamics of the casino workplace.

==== Fast-food employees ====
By using participant observation and interviews, Leidner (1993) examines how employers in fast food restaurants regulate workers' interactions with customers. According to Leidner (1993), employers attempt to regulate workers' interactions with customers only under certain conditions. Specifically, when employers attempt to regulate worker–customer interactions, employers believe that "the quality of the interaction is important to the success of the enterprise", that workers are "unable or unwilling to conduct the interactions appropriately on their own", and that the "tasks themselves are not too complex or context-dependent." According to Leidner (1993), regulating employee interactions with customers involves standardizing workers' personal interactions with customers. At the McDonald's fast food restaurants in Leidner's (1993) study, these interactions are strictly scripted, and workers' compliance with the scripts and regulations are closely monitored.

Along with examining employers' attempts to regulate employee–customer interactions, Leidner (1993) examines how fast-food workers' respond to these regulations. According to Leidner (1993), meeting employers' expectations requires workers to engage in some form of emotional labor. For example, McDonald's workers are expected to greet customers with a smile and friendly attitude independent of their own mood or temperament at the time. Leidner (1993) suggests that rigid compliance with these expectations is at least potentially damaging to workers' sense of self and identity. However, Leidner (1993) did not see the negative consequences of emotional labor in the workers she studied. Instead, McDonald's workers attempted to individualize their responses to customers in small ways. Specifically, they used humor or exaggeration to demonstrate their rebellion against the strict regulation of their employee–customer interactions.

=== Physicians ===
According to Larson and Yao (2005), empathy should characterize physicians' interactions with their patients because, despite advancement in medical technology, the interpersonal relationship between physicians and patients remains essential to quality healthcare. Larson and Yao (2005) argue that physicians consider empathy a form of emotional labor. Specifically, according to Larson and Yao (2005), physicians engage in emotional labor through deep acting by feeling sincere empathy before, during, and after interactions with patients. On the other hand, Larson and Yao (2005) argue that physicians engage in surface acting when they fake empathic behaviors toward the patient. Although Larson and Yao (2005) argue that deep acting is preferred, physicians may rely on surface acting when sincere empathy for patients is impossible. Overall, Larson and Yao (2005) argue that physicians are more effective and enjoy more professional satisfaction when they engage in empathy through deep acting due to emotional labor.

=== Psychologists and Therapists ===
According to Clarke (2024), fields like therapy where "emotional labor is a core component of psychological practice." Practitioners control their own emotional responses, but also take on the emotions of their patients. Emotional labor shows up in their field through empathy, emotional stability, and observations, even while dealing with their own hardships and trauma. In many cases, therapists use deep acting when engaging with their clients rather than forcing their emotions, so their responses can feel more authentic and supportive. Although deep acting lessens the result of emotional dissonance, it doesn't eradicate it from happening. A study has found that having self compassion and psychological flexibility can act as protective tool against stress and reduce burnout. It allows them to process their thoughts and emotions while adapting to emotional demands effectively. Overall, Clarke explains that emotional labor is embedded into the psychological field there are ways to decrease the chances of stress and give clients the effective care they need.

=== Police work ===
According to Martin (1999), police work involves substantial amounts of emotional labor by officers, who must control their own facial and bodily displays of emotion in the presence of other officers and citizens. Although policing is often viewed as stereotypically masculine work that focuses on fighting crime, policing also requires officers to maintain order and provide a variety of interpersonal services. For example, police must have a commanding presence that allows them to act decisively and maintain control in unpredictable situations while having the ability to actively listen and talk to citizens. According to Martin (1999), a police officer who displays too much anger, sympathy, or other emotion while dealing with danger on the job will be viewed by other officers as someone unable to withstand the pressures of police work, due to the sexist views of many police officers. While being able to balance this self-management of emotions in front of other officers, police must also assertively restore order and use effective interpersonal skills to gain citizen trust and compliance. Ultimately, the ability of police officers to effectively engage in emotional labor affects how other officers and citizens view them.

=== Public administration ===
Many scholars argue that the amount of emotional work required between all levels of government is greatest on the local level. It is at the level of cities and counties that the responsibility lies for day-to-day emergency preparedness, firefighters, law enforcement, public education, public health, and family and children's services. Citizens in a community expect the same level of satisfaction from their government, as they receive in a customer service-oriented job. This takes a considerate amount of work for both employees and employers in the field of public administration. Mastracci and Adams (2017) looks at public servants and how they may be at risk of being alienated because of their unsupported emotional labor demands from their jobs. This can cause surface acting and distrust in management. There are two comparisons that represent emotional labor within public administration, "Rational Work versus Emotion Work", and "Emotional Labor versus Emotional Intelligence."

==== Performance ====
Many scholars argue that when public administrators perform emotional labor, they are dealing with significantly more sensitive situations than employees in the service industry. The reason for this is because they are on the front lines of the government, and are expected by citizens to serve them quickly and efficiently. When confronted by a citizen or a co-worker, public administrators use emotional sensing to size up the emotional state of the citizen in need. Workers then take stock of their own emotional state in order to make sure that the emotion they are expressing is appropriate to their roles. Simultaneously, they have to determine how to act in order to elicit the desired response from the citizen as well as from co-workers. Public Administrators perform emotional labor through five different strategies: Psychological First Aid, Compartments and Closets, Crazy Calm, Humor, and Common Sense.

==== Definition: rational work vs. emotion work ====
According to Mary Guy, Public administration does not only focus on the business side of administration but on the personal side as well. It is not just about collecting the water bill or land ordinances to construct a new property, it is also about the quality of life and sense of community that is allotted to individuals by their city officials. Rational work is the ability to think cognitively and analytically, while emotional work means to think more practically and with more reason.

==== Definition: intelligence vs. emotional intelligence ====
Knowing how to suppress and manage one's own feelings is known as emotional intelligence. The ability to control one's emotions and to be able to do this at a high level guarantees one's own ability to serve those in need. Emotional intelligence is performed while performing emotional labor, and without one the other cannot be there.

=== Sex work ===
Emotional labor is an essential part of many service jobs, including many types of sex work. Through emotional labor, sex workers engage in different levels of acting known as surface acting and deep acting. These levels reflect a sex worker's engagement with the emotional labor. Surface acting occurs when the sex worker is aware of the dissonance between their authentic experience of emotion and their managed emotional display. In contrast, deep acting occurs when the sex worker can no longer differentiate between what is authentic and what is acting; acting becomes authentic.

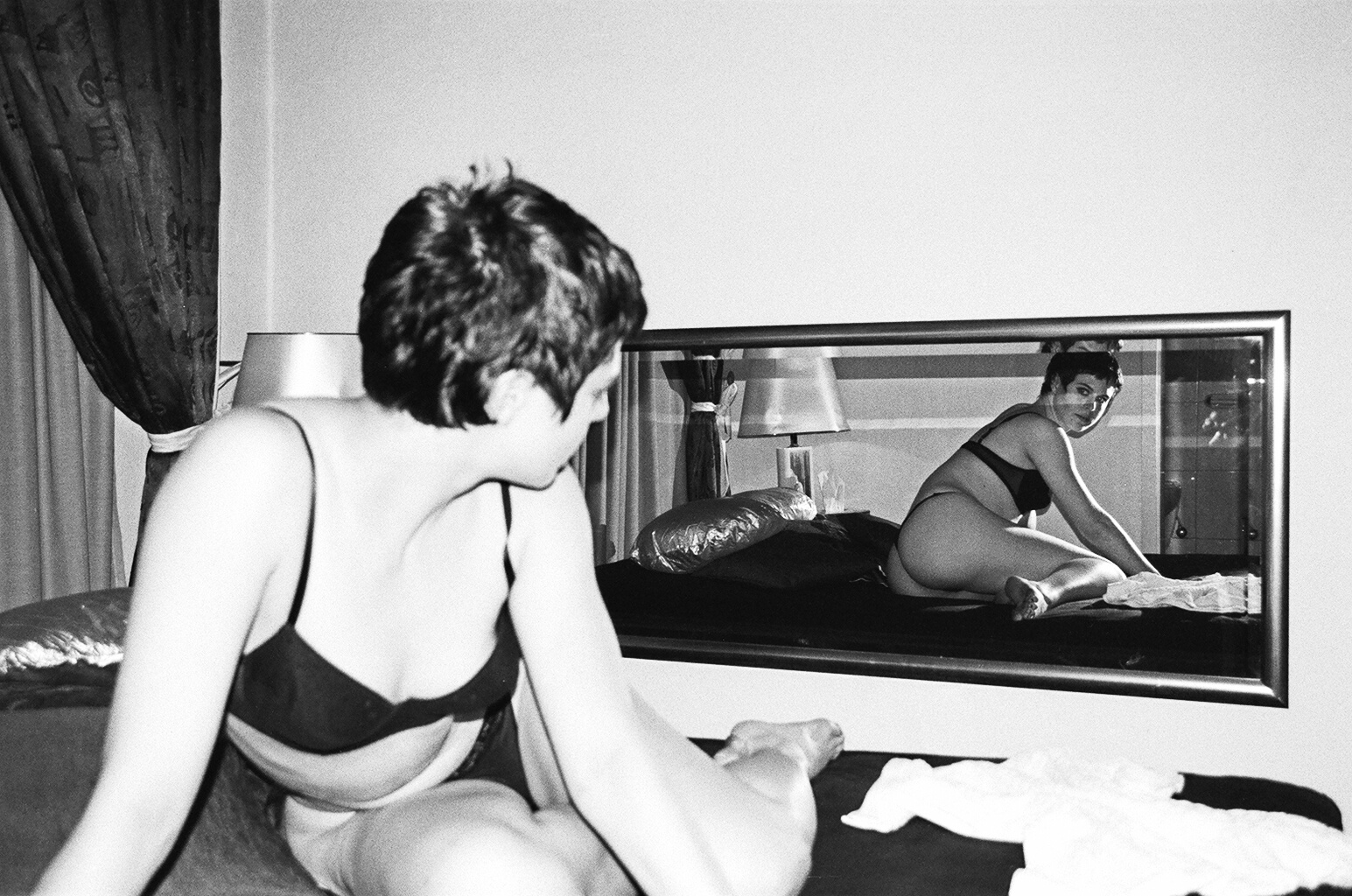
A sex worker in Berlin in 2001

Sex workers engage in emotional labor for many different reasons. First, sex workers often engage in emotional labor to construct performances of gender and sexuality. These performances frequently reflect the desires of a clientele which is mostly composed of heterosexual men. In the majority of cases, clients value women who they perceive as normatively feminine. For women sex workers, achieving this perception necessitates a performance of gender and sexuality that involves deference to clients and affirmation of their masculinity, as well as physical embodiment of traditional femininity. The emotional labor involved in sex work may be of a greater significance when race differences are involved. For instance, Mistress Velvet, a black, femme dominatrix, advertises herself using her most fetishized attributes. She makes her clients, who are mostly white heterosexual men, read Black feminist theory before their sessions. This allows the clients to see why their participation, as white heterosexual men, contributes to the fetishization of black women.

Both within sex work and in other types of work, emotional labor is gendered in that women are expected to use it to construct performances of normative femininity, whereas men are expected to use it to construct performances of normative masculinity. In both cases, these expectations are often met because this labor is necessary to maximize monetary gain and potentially to job retention. Indeed, emotional labor is often used to maximize income. It fosters a better experience for the client and protects the worker, enabling the worker to maximize profit.

In addition, sex workers often engage in emotional labor as a self-protection strategy, distancing themselves from the sometimes emotionally volatile work. Finally, clients often value perceived authenticity in their transactions with sex workers; thus, sex workers may attempt to foster a sense of authentic intimacy. Some scholars note that expectations surrounding emotional labor can also intersect with broader social, cultural, and institutional contexts that shape how sex workers' labor is understood.

== Gender ==
Macdonald and Sirianna (1996) use the term "emotional proletariat" to describe service jobs in which "workers exercise emotional labor wherein they are required to display friendliness and deference to customers." Because of deference, these occupations tend to be stereotyped as female jobs, independent of the actual number of women working the job. According to Macdonald and Sirianna (1996), because deference is a characteristic demanded of all those in disadvantaged structural positions, especially women, when deference is made a job requirement, women are likely to be overrepresented in these jobs. Macdonald and Sirianna (1996) claim that "[i]n no other area of wage labor are the personal characteristics of the workers so strongly associated with the nature of the work." Thus, according to Macdonald and Sirianna (1996), although all workers employed within the service economy may have a difficult time maintaining their dignity and self-identity due to the demands of emotional labor, such an issue may be especially problematic for women workers.

Emotional labor also affects women by perpetuating occupational segregation and the gender wage gap. Job segregation, which is the systematic tendency for men and women to work in different occupations, is often cited as the reason why women lack equal pay when compared to men. According to Guy and Newman (2004), occupational segregation and ultimately the gender wage gap can at least be partially attributed to emotional labor. Specifically, work-related tasks that require emotional work thought to be natural for women, such as caring and empathizing are requirements of many female-dominated occupations. However, according to Guy and Newman (2004), these feminized work tasks are not a part of formal job descriptions and performance evaluations: "Excluded from job descriptions and performance evaluations, the work is invisible and uncompensated. Public service relies heavily on such skills, yet civil service systems, which are designed on the assumptions of a bygone era, fail to acknowledge and compensate emotional labor." According to Guy and Newman (2004), women working in positions that require emotional labour in addition to regular work are not compensated for this additional labour because of the sexist notion that the additional labour is to be expected of them by the fact of being a woman. Guy and Azhar (2018) found that emotive expressions between sexes is affected by culture. This study found that there is variability to how women and men interpret emotive words, and specifically results showed that culture played a huge role in these gender differences.

== Disability ==
People with disabilities are becoming increasingly part of the labor force due to societal attitudes about inclusion and neoliberal pressures around reducing welfare. Roles that require emotional labor may be more difficult for people with certain kinds of disabilities to perform. People with disabilities may also have to put more time and energy to perform a task than non-disabled people, for instance, when they routinely encounter prejudice and stigma (as would be the case for many groups experiencing prejudice) including disability-unfriendly structures (accessibility, administrative or social). On the other hand, due to the routine experience of navigating unhelpful structures and prejudice, people with disabilities can have the dual advantage of better skills in finding ways around problems without expending emotional energy, like feeling surprised, and a more empathetic understanding of the experiences of other people with similar problems. Inclusive or unfriendly organizational culture also has an impact, and workplaces may require workers with disabilities to downplay their impairments in order to "fit in" creating an extra burden of emotional labor. Most individuals will experience complex effects of their disabilities on their emotional labor in a given job role at a specified organisation and disabled individuals often have to expend a large amount of emotional labour in order to receive the financial or medical support they are dependent on.

== Implications ==
Positive affective display in service interactions, such as smiling and conveying friendliness, are positively associated with positive feelings in customers, as well as important outcomes, including intention to return, intention to recommend a store to others, and perception of overall service quality. There is evidence that emotional labor may lead to employees' emotional exhaustion and burnout over time. A higher degree of using emotion regulation on the job is related to higher levels of employees' emotional exhaustion, and lower levels of employees' job satisfaction.

There is empirical evidence that higher levels of emotional labor demands are not uniformly rewarded with higher wages. Rather, the reward is dependent on the level of general cognitive demands required by the job: occupations with high cognitive demands show wage returns with increasing emotional labor demands; whereas occupations low in cognitive demands evidence a wage "penalty" with increasing emotional labor demands. Additionally, innovations that increase employee empowerment—such as conversion into worker cooperatives, co-managing schemes, or flattened workplace structures—have been found to increase workers' levels of emotional labor, as they take on more workplace responsibilities.

=== Positive outcomes ===
Emotional labor can have positive effects on workers as well, especially when workers use emotional regulation strategies. In some cases, emotional labor gives employees feelings of internal satisfaction, allows them to improve their communication skills, and brings a higher rate of customer satisfaction. According to Lynch and Klima (2020), the way a worker manages their emotions is an important key in how it affects them, specifically when using strategies like deep acting. Research suggests that deep acting is associated with improved communication and stronger workplace relationships. Emotional labor involving emotions like empathy, attentiveness, and patience can improve trust and cooperation in the workplace. According to Pugliesi (1999), helping fields like healthcare and education provide a sense of drive and personal fulfillment when employees see their emotional effort helping others. When emotional expressions are more natural rather than forced, workers may experience an increase in job satisfaction and lessen the feeling of burnout.

Racialized emotional labor and Inequality

Racialized emotional labor refers to the connection between a worker's race and emotional expectations of them in the workplace. According to Humphrey (2022), "[R]acial bias in public organizations creates disparities in emotional labor," with different expectations put on different races. Employees of color reported more frequent negative interactions with the public compared to white employees, including bias and disrespect. Despite this, employees of color are still expected to have high levels of professionalism and emotional control. The extra emotional labor done by employees of color is described as an "unseen burden", as these actions are not compensated, recognized, or measured when managers look at their performances. This imbalance becomes more recognizable when gender is also included. According to Barboza-Wilkes (2022), "[W]omen of color engage in more taxing forms of emotional labor," due to the need for emotional suppression, which decreases feelings of personal accomplishment. Trying to stay away from gender and racial stereotypes leads to constant self-monitoring and code-switching. The extra emotional regulations that workers of color endure can negatively impact their mental health.

=== Coping skills ===
Coping is a response to psychological stress in which one seeks to maintain their mental health and emotional well-being. Coping skills are behaviors, thoughts, and emotions that people use to adjust to the changes and stressors in their lives, both negative (e.g. loss of a job) and positive (e.g. getting a new job). The use of coping skills allows people to perform to the best of their ability and achieve success in the workplace. There are many coping strategies, including sharing emotions with peers, maintaining a healthy social life outside of work, being humorous, and adjusting expectations of work and oneself. Coping skills can turn negative emotions into positive emotions, and allow the employee to focus more on the public (in contrast to themself).

== See also ==
- Hazing
- Anxiety
- Bullying
- Harassment
- Social stress
- Affect display
- Emotion work
- Affective labor
- Cognitive labor
- Compassion fatigue
- Emotional detachment
- Emotional self-regulation
- Kinkeeping
- Mental health
- Display rules
- Peer pressure
- Toxic positivity
- Group emotion
- Dispositional affect
- Emotions and culture
- Thought suppression
- Postponement of affect
- Afterburn (psychotherapy)
- Sexism
- Social influence
- Superficial charm
- Verbal self defense
- Smile mask syndrome
- Vicarious traumatization
- Marx's theory of alienation
- Organizational psychology
- Keeping up with the joneses
- Customer relationship management
- Caregiver burden
