= Emotion regime =

Rule-like system shaping how people should feel

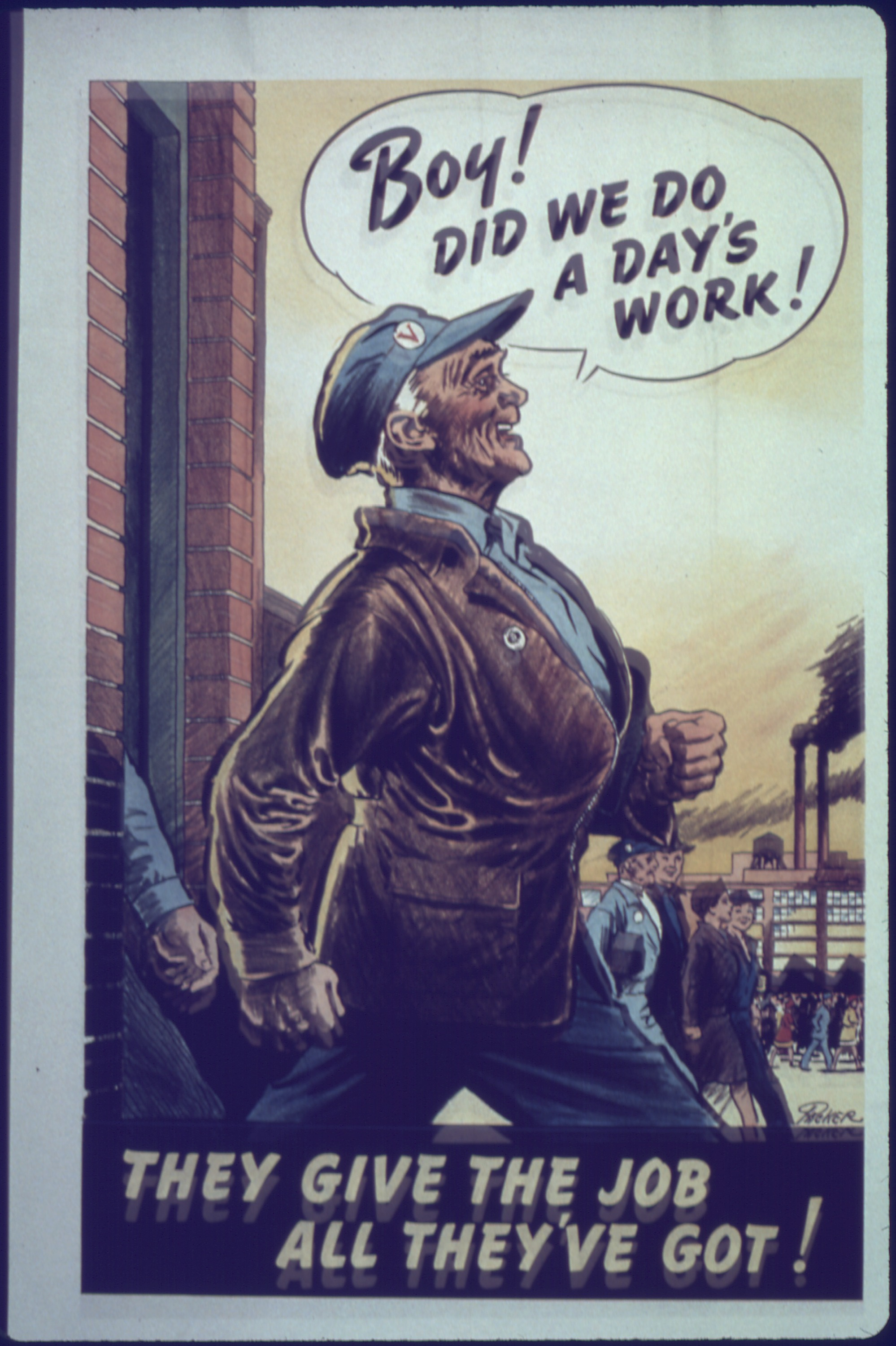
Promoting expected emotions about war production during World War II

The term emotion regime (also rendered by William Reddy as emotional regime, and in German published work as Gefühlsregime or "regime of feelings") refers to the particular set of shared expectations that guide how individuals are to feel and express themselves in particular social settings. The differing structures of these social norms influence expectations that guide everyday conduct and vary across historical periods and communities. Reddy defines an emotional regime as a configuration of prescribed "emotives" (expressions involved in the description and production of feelings), together with the rituals and practices they are conveyed through.

The term was introduced and elaborated by Reddy in The Navigation of Feeling, where he analysed shifts in dominant emotion regimes during the French Revolution. The concept is often discussed alongside Barbara Rosenwein's framework of emotional communities; groups that share norms, valuations, and styles of expression. Historians have also situated emotion regimes within broader historiographical debates about how community expectations of proper or acceptable behavior are formed and how they change over time.

As an analytic tool, the concept of an emotion regime can be used to describe how emotional norms are organized, maintained, and contested, and demonstrate how political, religious, professional, or familial settings can result in the formation of expectations that influence conduct and constrain autonomy. Analysts have used the framework to investigate institutions, identity groups, political movements, and digital cultures, analysing how they enforce standards of affective expression and how individuals navigate, adapt to, or resist them. (Note: Although Reddy's earlier work focused on large emotion regimes, in an illustrative example analysing the coordinative rather than repressive regime of Crew resource management (CRM), he notes that "A well-established, obligatory emotional style such as CRM can be called an emotional "regime"—although the groups involved may be quite small.")

Major definitions and scholarly debates on emotion regimes are presented alongside accounts of the adjacent mechanisms they operate through, the historical and contemporary cases they appear in, and their application across institutional, social, political, and digital contexts.

== Overview ==
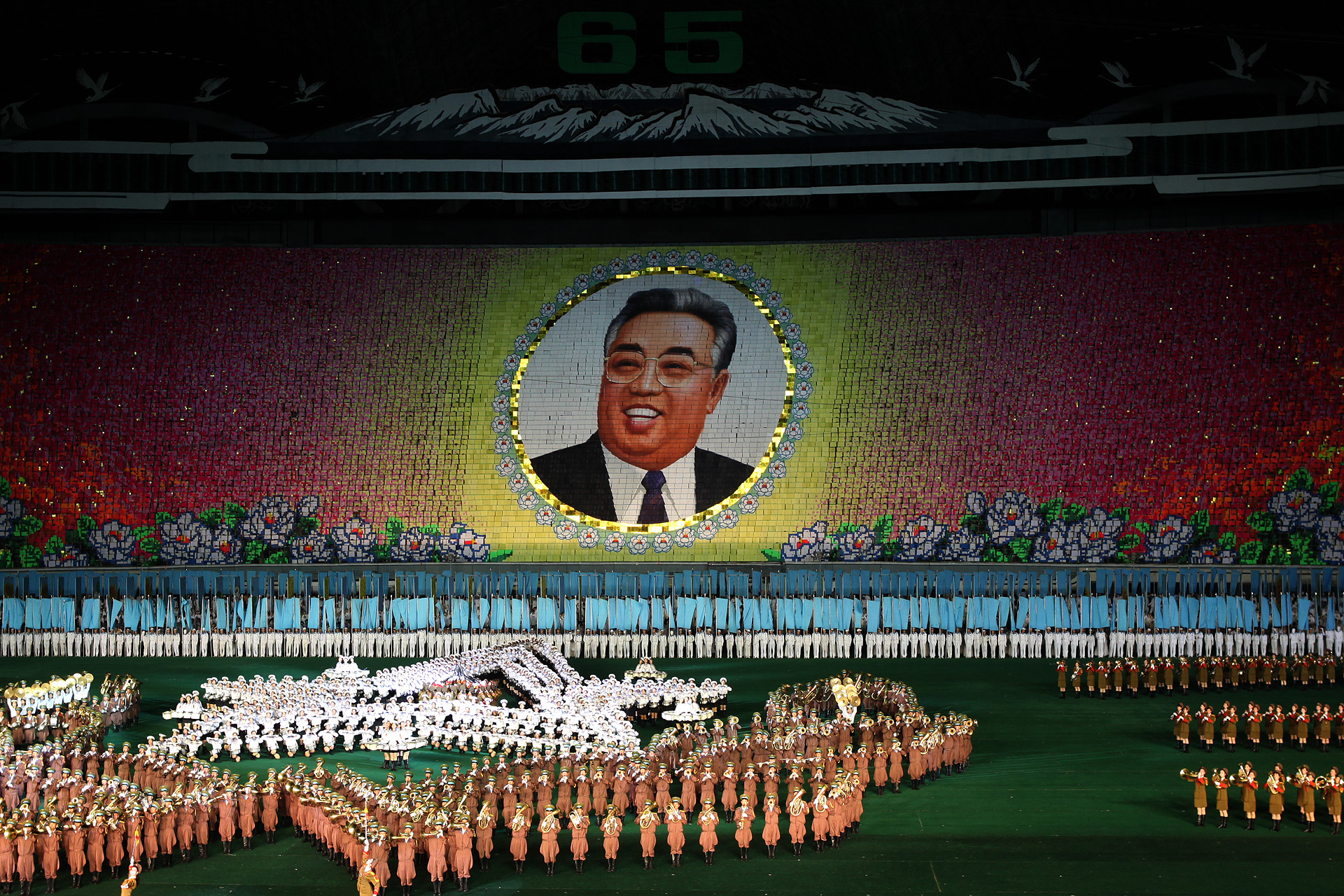
Emotion engineered by ritual spectacle and hyper synchrony

The term emotion regime is used to describe the shared expectations that prescribe how individuals ought to feel and express themselves in particular settings. These arrangements are historically situated and shaped by social power, a point emphasised in analyses in which it is argued that emotions are structured responses shaped by cultural environments, as opposed to merely private states of mind.

=== Visibility of emotion expectations ===
People routinely navigate settings in which expectations about appropriate feelings are clearly marked. In schools, students may learn that enthusiasm is welcomed while frustration must be carefully controlled. Workplaces likewise cultivate expectations about demeanour; for instance, studies of service labour show how organisations encourage workers to display cheerfulness as part of professional conduct. Online platforms also promote recurring affective patterns as users learn which styles of expression are rewarded, which are discouraged, and how circulating feelings come to organise participation.

=== Relevance ===
Identifying such patterned expectations is the core contribution of the concept of emotion regimes. Examination of group-specific emotional norms shows that institutions and communities display shared valued and disvalued feelings. The hypothesis proposed is that cultural formations organise emotions in ways that reinforce or challenge social power.

== Definition ==
Historians use the term to describe patterned structures that shape how feelings may be expressed, interpreted, and regulated in specific settings.

=== Simple definition ===
An emotion regime can be understood as the patterned environment of emotional expectations that surrounds people in a particular setting. It refers to the ways that social groups, institutions, or societies indicate which feelings should be expressed, which should be repressed, and how individuals are expected to display those feelings in everyday interactions. These expectations may be conveyed through routines, rituals, or informal cues about what counts as an appropriate response in a given situation.

=== Canonical academic definition ===
In the historical study of emotions, the concept takes on a more precise meaning. Rosenwein summarizes William Reddy's definition as "the set of normative emotions and the official rituals, practices, and emotives that express and inculcate them." In Reddy's framework, regimes prescribe which feelings count as legitimate, how they should be articulated, and how individuals are expected to orient themselves toward those norms.

=== Conceptual elements ===
Emotion regimes consist of several interconnected elements:

1. They articulate norms that define which feelings and expressions are valued, discouraged, or prohibited.
2. Regimes rely on rituals and practices that reinforce these norms in daily life, with examples being commemorations, public declarations, gestures, or forms of address.
3. They establish mechanisms for distinguishing legitimate from illegitimate feelings, whether through praise, censure, or more formal sanctions.
4. Emotion regimes are historically and culturally specific: they emerge in response to particular social conditions, and shifts in regimes often occur when their norms generate significant emotional strain or conflict.

=== Distinction from related concepts ===
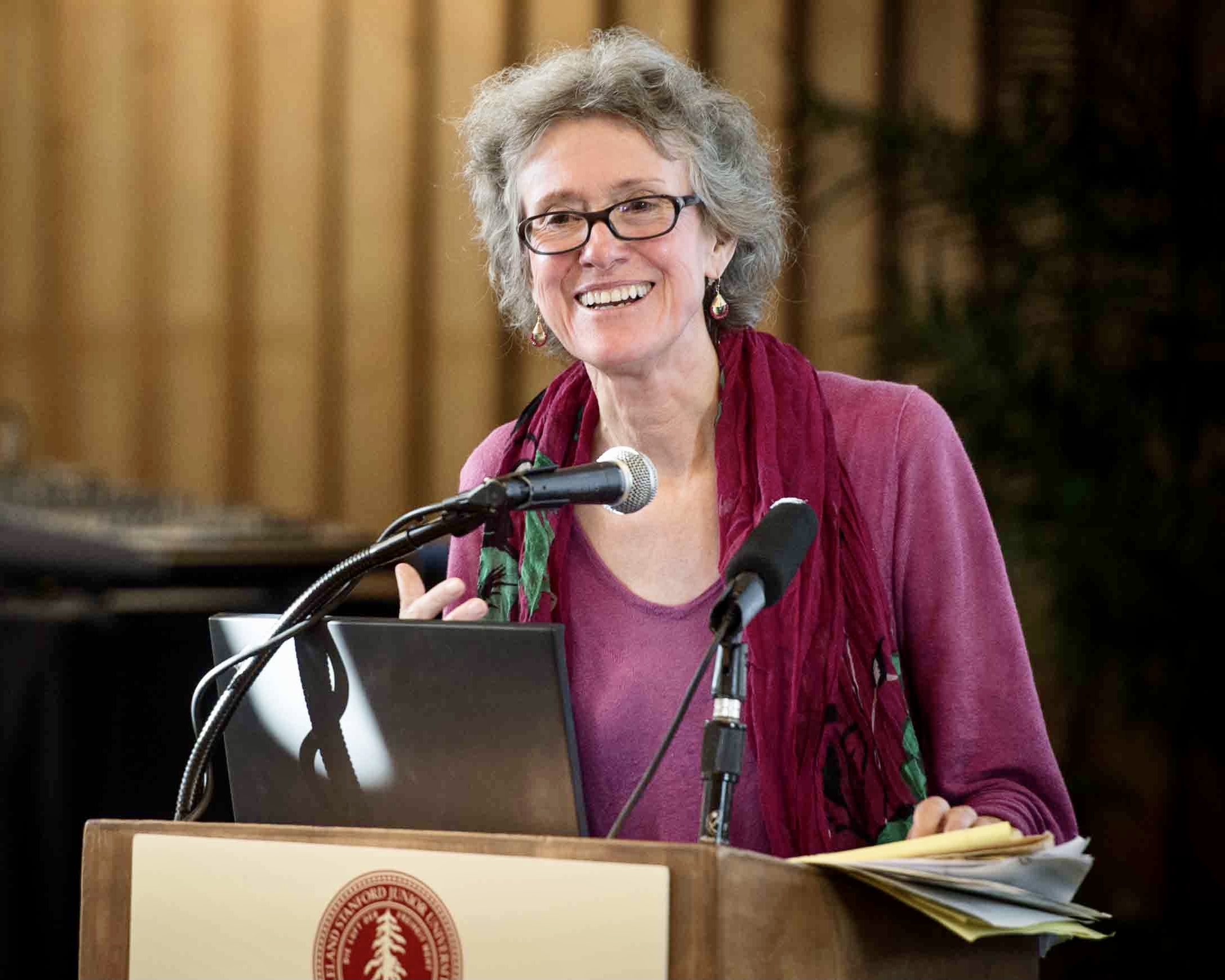
Arlie Russell Hochschild, leading architect of feeling rules whose pioneering concepts reshaped sociological understandings of how communities organize and regulate affect.

Although related to several neighboring terms, "emotion regime" has a distinct analytical focus. Rosenwein's concept of emotional communities describe groups bound together by shared norms, values, and styles of emotional expression focusing on the affective cohesion of a community rather than the externally-imposed standards enforced by authorities. By contrast, an emotion regime highlights regulation, prescription, and the power-laden processes by which emotional norms are maintained. Reddy's concept also intersects with sociologist Arlie Hochschild's idea of feeling rules, which identify micro-level expectations guiding individual emotional expression, but emotion regimes encompass broader institutional and political structures that set and enforce those rules.

== Function ==
Emotion regimes operate through interlocking patterns of customary behavior that guide how people are expected to feel, express themselves, and interpret social situations. Prescriptive rules, interpretive frames, sanctions, ritual forms, and possibilities for change are examples of several mechanisms that writers in the field describe as influencing patterned emotional conduct within specific settings.

=== Feeling rules ===
Hochschild introduced the concept of "feeling rules," defining them as shared standards that specify how a person "ought to feel" in particular situations and how those feelings should be expressed in order to sustain proper social relations. These norms help determine whether individuals should induce, suppress, or modify feelings, and they are central to workplace settings, where interaction with clients or passengers requires managing one's affective display. Hochschild argues that individuals engage in "emotion management" to meet these rules, a process that may involve either surface acting or deep acting when the emotional expectations built into a job demand sustained forms of cheerfulness, patience, or calm. Feeling rules thus provide the shared expectations that emotion regimes rely on to indicate what counts as appropriate conduct.

=== Expectations and interpretive frames ===
Beyond explicit feeling rules, people learn to interpret situations through culturally-shared frameworks that guide the emotions they take to be appropriate on any given occasion. Drawing on Erving Goffman's account of the interaction order, analysts emphasize that social encounters rely on tacit definitions of the situation that structure alignments, obligations, and expectations. In face-to-face encounters, participants continuously manage "face" (their social value) by orienting to cues that signal respect, deference, or involvement. These frames help organize emotional expectations by indicating whether embarrassment, reassurance, restraint, or warmth is situationally appropriate. In collective settings, shared ways of understanding situations also shape the feelings people learn to use, helping them identify what counts as a grievance, which emotions are seen as acceptable, and which responses are socially approved.

=== Sanctions and social enforcement ===
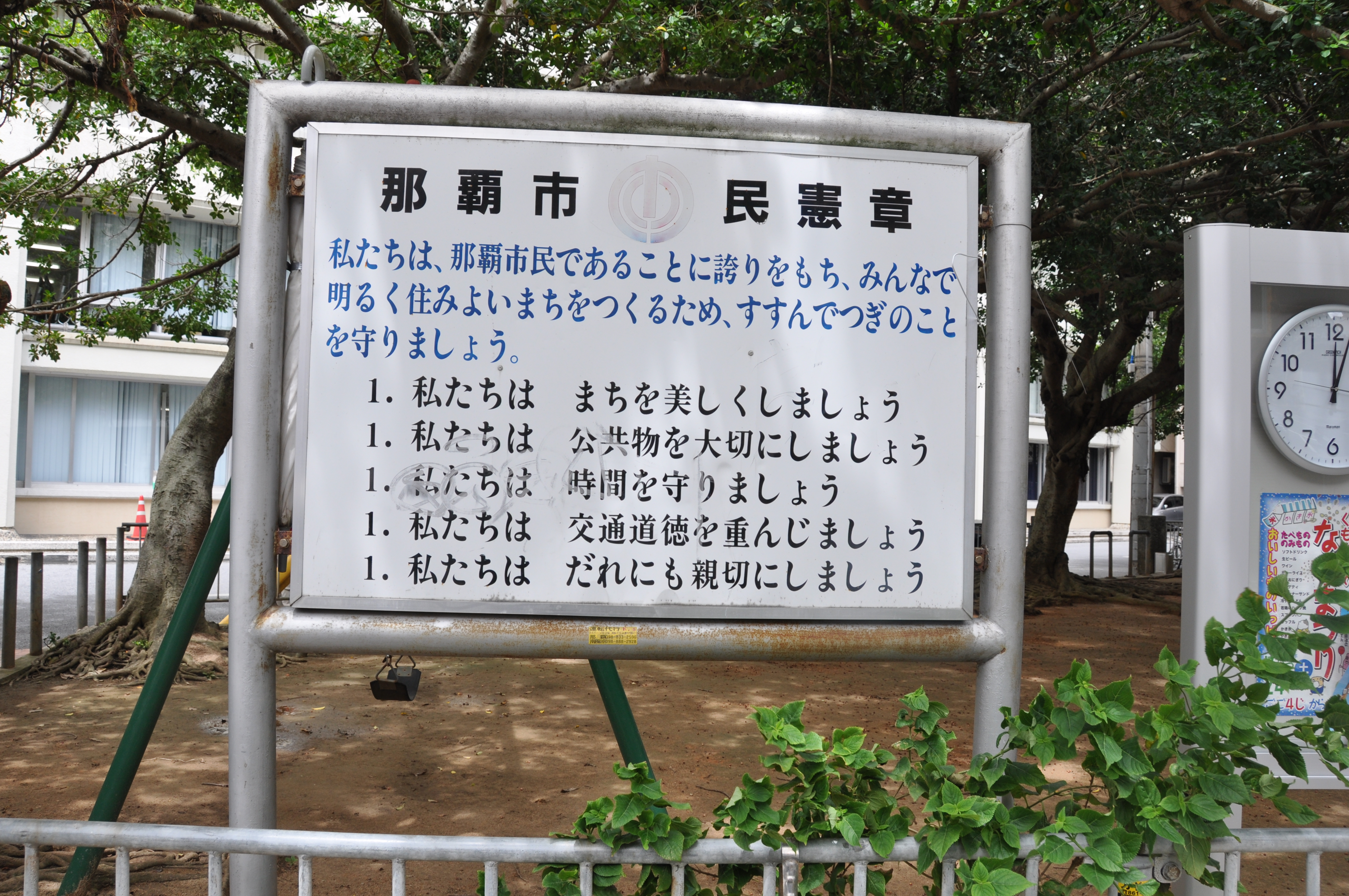
Japanese billboard in Naha (In English: People's charter: We are proud to be Naha citizens, and together we will actively adhere to the following in order to create a bright and livable city.: 1. Let's make our town beautiful; 2. We should respect public property; 3. We should be punctual; 4. We should respect road ethics.; 5. Let us be kind to everyone!)

Emotion regimes are sustained through formal and informal sanctions that encourage conformity to patterned expectations. Thomas Scheff argues that shame and embarrassment form a central mechanism through which individuals monitor one another's adherence to social bonds and interactional obligations. Even subtle signs of rejection, a missed conversational beat, or withheld acknowledgment, can produce shame and thereby reinforce norms of deference and alignment. Reddy similarly maintains that divergence between personal experience and a dominant regime's prescribed emotives can generate emotional suffering, as individuals struggle to navigate norms that do not correspond to their lived experience.

=== Symbolic and ritual components ===
Goffman's analysis of ritual elements shows that greetings, partings, honorifics, and other ceremonial gestures help reproduce shared understandings of propriety, thereby embedding the feelings a situation calls for within the fabric of social interaction. Such ritualized practices affirm the value of particular emotional stances, for example, reverence in formal ceremonies or composure in professional settings. Practice-oriented researchers further note that these enactments become habitual and embodied, as repeated gestures and patterned interactions train participants to respond with dispositions that align with the prevailing order.

=== Change, breakdown, and emotional agency ===
Emotion regimes are not fixed; they may loosen, fracture, or be replaced when their norms no longer align with lived experience. William Reddy introduces the concept of "emotional liberty" to describe moments when individuals or groups articulate feelings that exceed or contradict dominant prescriptions, so that they can experiment with alternative forms of expression. Such moments often emerge in periods of political upheaval, institutional instability, or cultural transformation. Analysts of social movements further show how new sentiments can mobilize collective action when actors contest prevailing norms or construct alternative emotional scripts.

== Historical emotion regimes ==
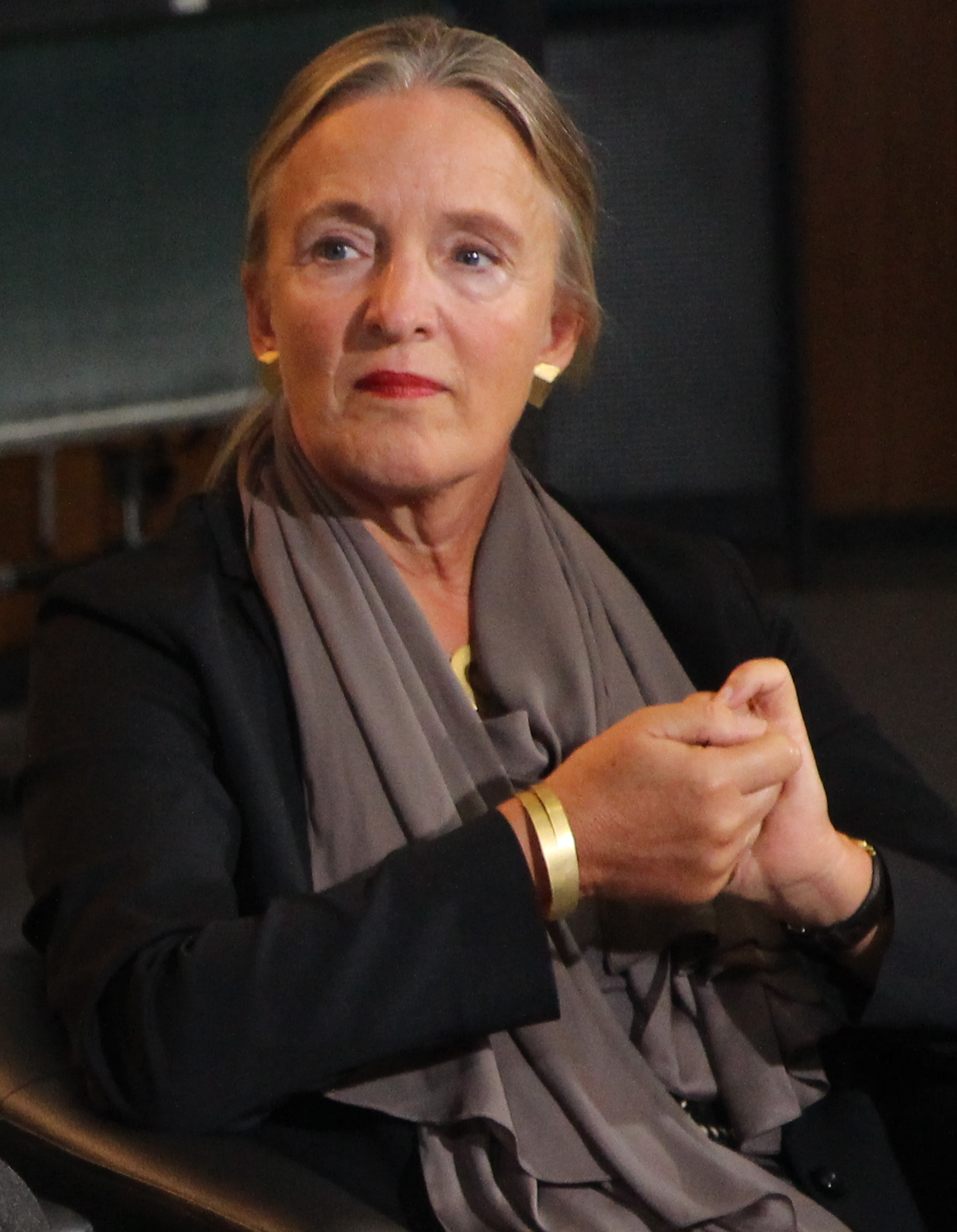
Ute Frevert, a historian of emotions who researched how emotions function as historically contingent practices that structure social order and political authority.

Historians of emotions use the idea of emotion regimes or emotional regimes to describe historically specific configurations of prescribed feelings, evaluative vocabularies, and sanctioned practices that link inner experience to public order over time. Building on William Reddy's analysis of eighteenth- and nineteenth-century France and Ute Frevert's work on modern Europe, research has traced how such regimes emerge, how they organise norms of feeling and expression, and how they are transformed through political upheaval, social change, and shifts in the language of feeling.

=== Reddy's foundational historical cases ===
In The Navigation of Feeling, Reddy introduces "emotional regimes" as ensembles of prescribed "emotives" – speech acts that both express and help shape feeling – together with the rituals and institutional arrangements that support them. In his typology, regimes can be more or less strict: highly constraining regimes secure stability partly by producing "emotional suffering", Reddy's term for the distress that arises when individuals cannot reconcile their own feelings and goals with socially mandated patterns of expression. An important criterion for evaluating historical regimes is thus the degree of "emotional liberty" they afford – the extent to which people can reorient their projects and relationships without intolerable inner conflict.

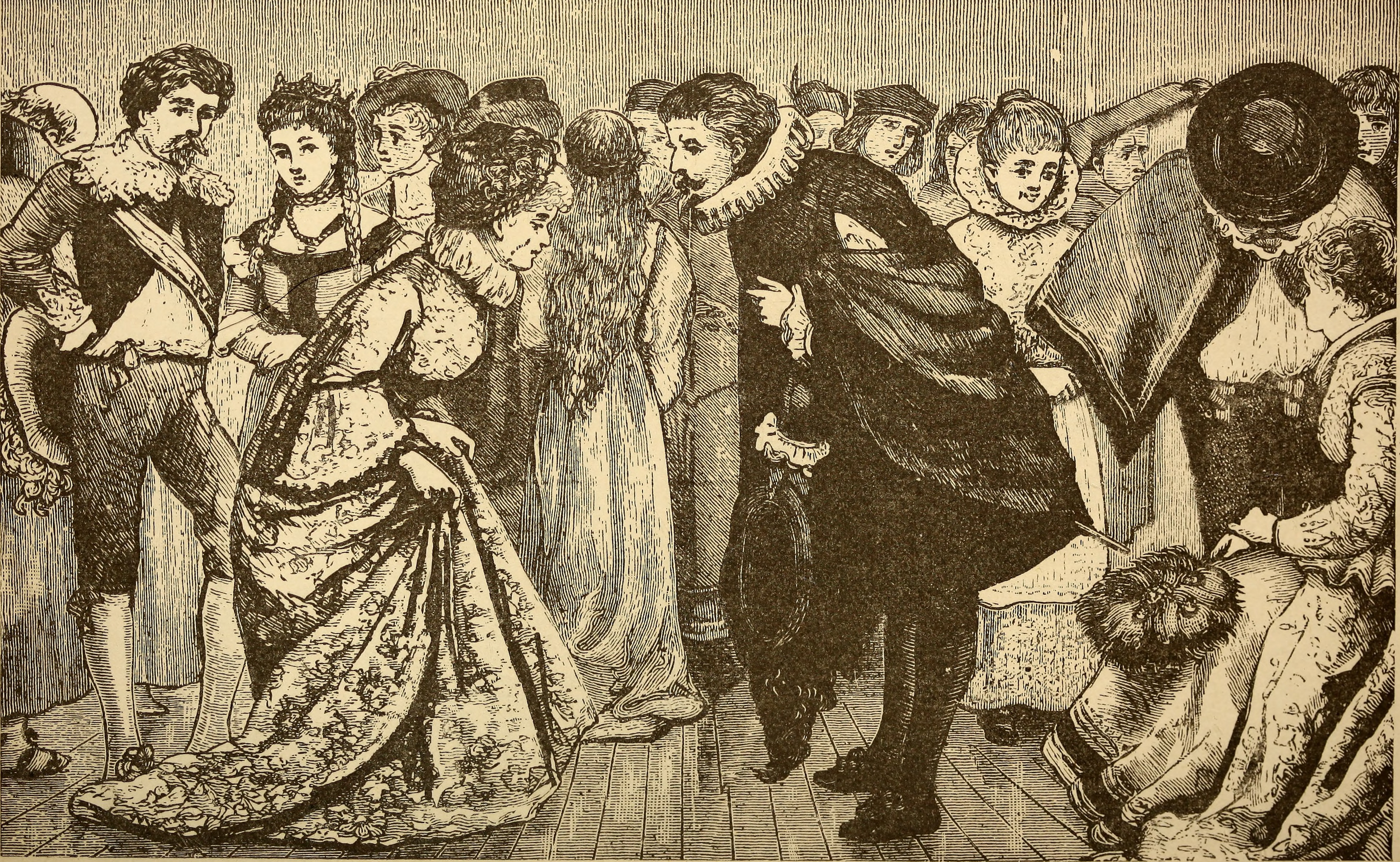
In prior centuries and across cultures, there have been strict courtly regimes of tightly regulated expression of emotion

Reddy develops these concepts through a detailed reconstruction of France between 1700 and 1850. In chapters 5–7 he argues that, under the absolute monarchy, courtly codes of honour and deference formed a relatively strict regime that tightly regulated how subjects could express anger, loyalty, or affection toward the king, lovers, and one another. He suggests that this configuration created incentives for courtiers and provincial elites to seek what he calls "emotional refuges" – alternative settings such as salons or literary circles in which they could pursue more expansive sentimental ideals without directly confronting the constraints of court society.

According to Reddy's analysis as presented by later commentators, the French Revolution can be understood as both a political and an emotion regime crisis. The prerevolutionary "sentimentalist" regime, nourished by literature and philosophy that prized sincerity and transparent feeling, encouraged actors to treat intense sympathy and virtue as markers of political authenticity. In this context, revolutionary leaders came to demand visible proofs of love for the patrie and hatred of its enemies; doubts about others' sincerity escalated into spirals of suspicion. Reddy interprets the Jacobin Terror as a moment when the sentimentalist regime's own norms of intense, publicly displayed feeling helped generate the emotional suffering – fear, anxiety, and guilt – that undermined its stability.

After the fall of Robespierre, Reddy sees a shift toward a more sceptical post-sentimental configuration, visible in the Directory and Napoleonic periods, in which overt displays of feeling in politics were treated with suspicion and more weight was placed on self-control and calculation. Yet, in his view, this new regime also redirected intense passions into reconfigured "emotional refuges" in private life and culture. The subsequent settlement that Reddy labels "liberal reason, romantic passions" – with its combination of constitutional politics and Romantic ideals of inward depth – is interpreted as a regime that offered somewhat greater emotional liberty, while still generating characteristic tensions between public restraint and private intensity.

Through these French cases, Reddy seeks to demonstrate that changes in political order are closely entangled with shifts in permissible feeling, available vocabularies of self-description, and the institutions that channel affective life. His narrative illustrates how internal contradictions within a regime – for example between demands for sincerity and the impossibility of fully transparent feeling in revolutionary politics – can contribute to regime breakdown and the emergence of new norms of feeling.

=== Frevert and the cultures of feeling in modern Europe ===
Ute Frevert extends this kind of analysis beyond a single national case, offering a macro-historical account of how norms of feeling developed in Europe from the early modern period to the twentieth century. In Writing the History of Emotions she speaks of "emotional cultures", by which she means historically specific constellations of valued and disapproved feelings, patterns of expression, and institutionalised expectations in different social fields. Rather than positing a single, linear progression, she emphasises how state formation, capitalist economies, gender orders, and international politics generated multiple, intersecting cultures of feeling that can be analysed in terms of regimes of feeling.

One central theme in Frevert's work is the role of honour as a key node in European regimes of feeling. In her studies of "practising honour", she shows how aristocratic and later bourgeois codes required men in particular to display readiness to use violence to defend status, while simultaneously subjecting such conduct to legal and moral regulation. Honour thus acted as a dynamic mediating point of shared expectations, linking and transforming inner dispositions (courage, sensitivity to insult) and outward practices (duelling, courtroom testimony, military discipline). Across the eighteenth and nineteenth centuries, Frevert traces how these honour cultures were reshaped by the expansion of state institutions and public spheres.

Frevert also analyses how emerging capitalist orders were accompanied by distinctive "emotional economies", a canonical term in her work for the patterned ways in which feelings such as greed, trust, and happiness were bound to market structures and moral judgements. In chapters on "Capitalist Cold?" and on money and happiness, she argues that nineteenth- and twentieth-century debates over the supposed coldness of markets, the proper place of compassion in economic life, and the pursuit of happiness as a measure of well-being reflected attempts to stabilise new regimes of feeling appropriate to capitalist societies.

In her discussion of "emotional politics", Frevert examines how European rulers and political movements in the long nineteenth century sought to cultivate loyalty, love, and trust among citizens. Monarchies and later nation-states developed various symbols, ceremonies, and narratives intended to produce affective attachment to the polity, including the portrayal of monarchs as caring paternal figures and the dramatisation of national suffering and sacrifice. These practices can be understood as elements of emotion regimes insofar as they prescribed appropriate ways of feeling about rulers, fellow citizens, and enemies, and linked those expectations to institutional routines such as schooling, conscription, and commemoration.

Frevert's work thus complements Reddy's French focus by showing how, across different European societies, regimes of feeling co-evolved with changing configurations of power, law, and economy.

=== Regime formation and transformation across eras ===
Jan Plamper summarises Reddy's definition of an "emotional regime" as the ensemble of prescribed emotives and the rituals that sustain them, noting that Reddy's historical chapters demonstrate how such ensembles are anchored in specific institutional settings – courts, revolutionary assemblies, bureaucracies – and supported by explicit and implicit norms of feeling. Frevert, in turn, highlights how armies, legal systems, markets, and international relations have each generated their own characteristic expectations about fear, courage, shame, empathy, and other key feelings.

Both authors show that new regimes typically crystallise under conditions of significant reorganisation of power. For Reddy, the emergence of a sentimentalist regime in eighteenth-century France is tied to the spread of new literary forms, sociability, and political ideas that elevated sincerity and pity as civic virtues; this configuration was then tested and partly undone by the Revolution and its aftermath. For Frevert, the formation of modern European states involved the deliberate crafting of "emotional politics" that bound citizens to institutions through cultivated trust, love of the nation, and justified fear of external enemies.

Reddy's notion of "emotional suffering" demonstrates how regimes may be destabilised. When the demands of a regime repeatedly force individuals into conflicts between mandated display and felt experience, they may seek alternative scripts and settings – the "emotional refuges" he identifies – in which other ways of feeling become thinkable. In his account, revolutionary crises thus appear as moments when previously dominant regimes of feeling become untenable for large numbers of people.

Changes in vocabularies of feeling are another indicator of regime transformation. The collective project Emotional Lexicons: Continuity and Change in the Vocabulary of Feeling 1700–2000 surveys encyclopedias and dictionaries in German, English, and French to show how terms for feelings have been defined, grouped, and revalued over three centuries. Frevert's discussion of this work emphasises that shifts from "passions" and "affections" to "emotions" as central psychological categories, and the emergence or decline of particular feeling-words, track broader changes in how authorities, experts, and lay publics conceptualise inner life.

In his synthetic account, Plamper argues that Reddy's French case and the Max Planck group's lexicon studies demonstrate the heuristic value of tracing how prescribed feeling-rules, institutional practices, and vocabularies shift together over time.

=== Examples beyond France ===
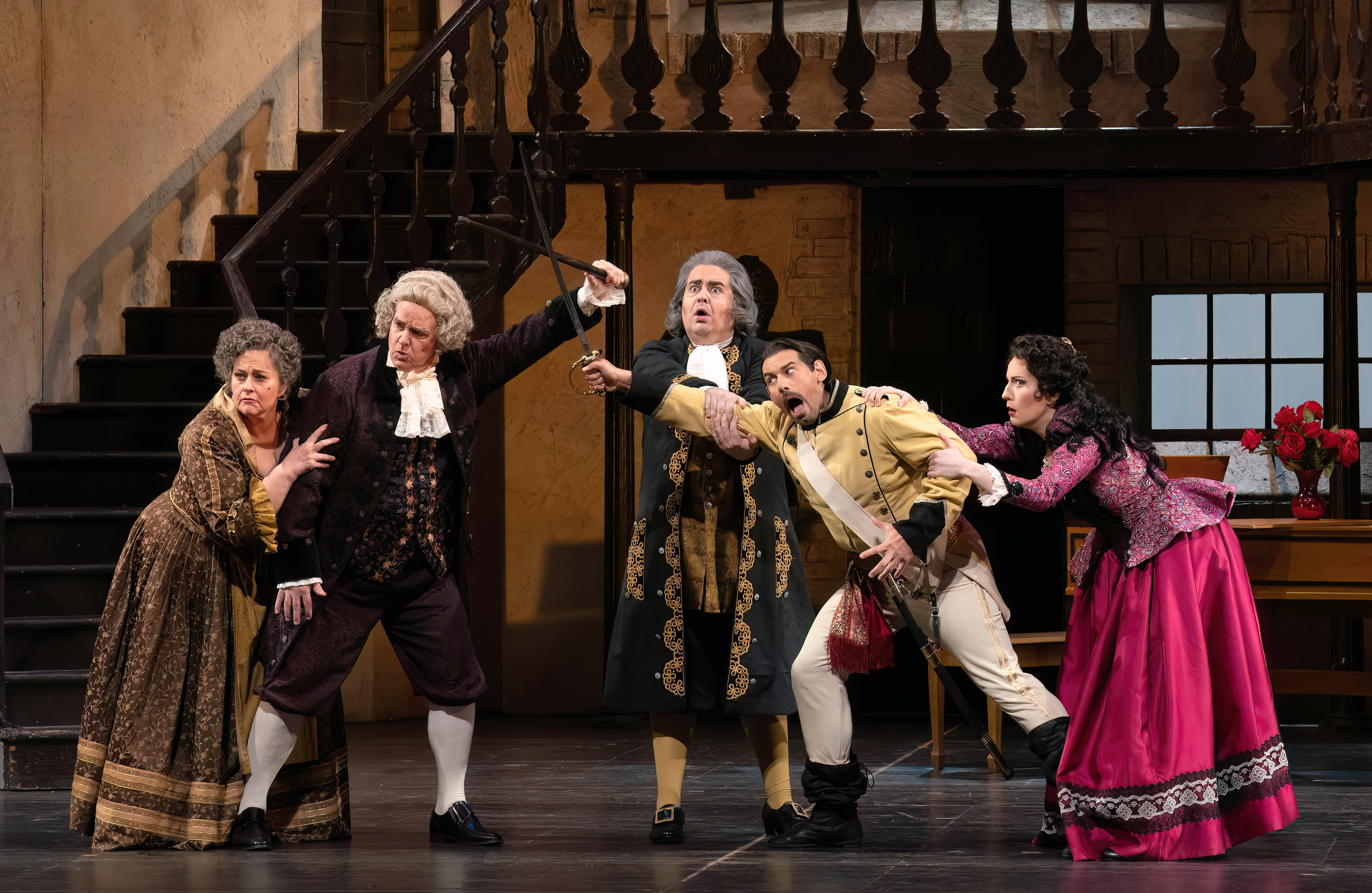
Literature and art form templates for emotional conduct. Specific examples include the 18th century sentimentalist works such as The Barber of Seville, but includes diverse forms such as opera, cinema and painting.

While Reddy's analysis focuses on France, Frevert's research and the Emotional Lexicons project provide examples of emotion regimes in other European contexts. In her work on honour, Frevert traces how Prussia and other German states cultivated specific ideals of masculine bravery, self-control, and readiness to fight, especially among officers and educated citizens. Military institutions, courts, and codes of etiquette together prescribed when anger, indignation, or shame were appropriate, and when they had to be restrained; breaches could result in legal sanctions and loss of status.

Frevert's chapter on "Emotional Politics in Europe's Long Nineteenth Century" offers another set of examples. She shows how constitutional monarchies and later parliamentary regimes developed commemorations, public ceremonies, and visual symbols designed to elicit loyalty and affection from citizens, and how oppositional movements sought in turn to mobilise indignation, resentment, or hope. Across countries, rulers and parties experimented with different combinations of paternal care, patriotic exaltation, and controlled fear of internal and external enemies, contributing to distinct national patterns of political feeling that can be described in terms of differing emotion regimes.

The Emotional Lexicons volume extends the geographical range by analysing changes in feeling vocabularies in German, English, and French reference works from 1700 to 2000. By comparing entries on concepts such as anger, fear, sympathy, or stress across languages and periods, the contributors show how some feelings were newly named, subdivided, or linked to medical and psychological expertise, while others receded from authoritative discourse.

In her studies of twentieth-century Europe, including her work on postwar Germany, Frevert argues that democratic and authoritarian regimes alike relied on structured appeals to feeling – for example, calls to mourn war dead, to celebrate economic achievements, or to fear ideological enemies – but did so through distinct institutional channels and accepted patterns for how feelings should be expressed.

== Institutional and social emotion regimes ==
=== Family systems and intimate norms ===
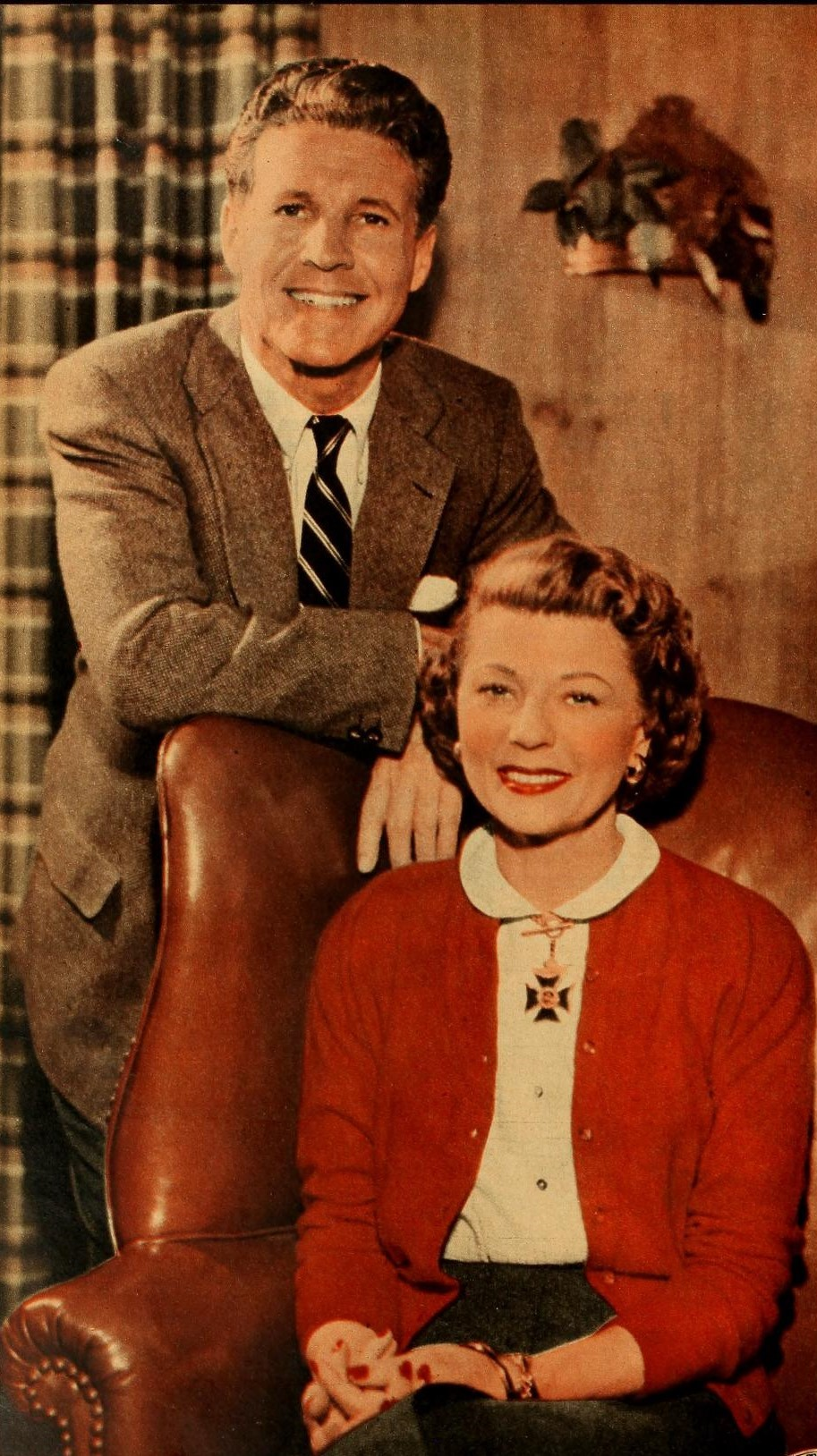
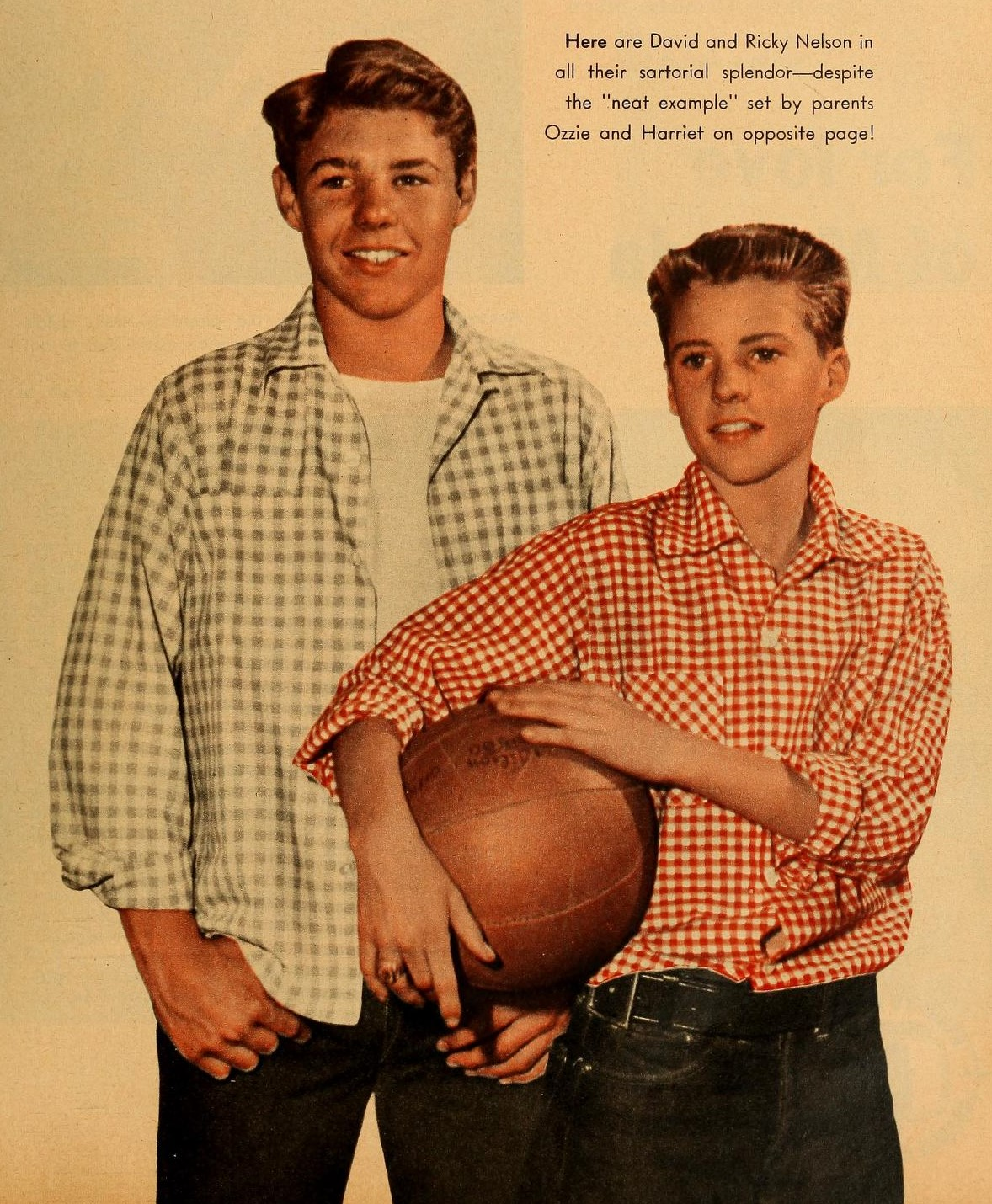
A mid-twentieth-century family ideal depicted by the radio-television Nelson family

Families constitute some of the most enduring environments in which norms of feeling and expression are learned. Within households, expectations surrounding anger, shame, pride, affection, and restraint form a patterned framework that guides early socialisation. Thomas Scheff's microsociological account describes how the "deference–emotion system" shapes intimate bonds: family members continually monitor signs of acceptance or rejection, and threats to these bonds generate acute responses linked to shame and pride. Scheff emphasises that embarrassment and shame arise whenever legitimacy within the relationship is jeopardised, while the experience of being recognised appropriately fosters pride and solidarity.

Describing groups whose members share norms about valued emotions, styles of expression, and interpretive assumptions, Rosenwein introduced the concept of emotional communities to provide a complementary framework for analysing households as carriers of feeling norms. Rosenwein notes that emotional communities are structured by "fundamental assumptions, values, goals, feeling rules, and accepted modes of expression," and they may exist as overlapping circles of more intimate subgroups.

=== Organizations and professional expectations ===
Organisational settings impose distinctive expectations regarding comportment and feeling. Arlie Hochschild's analysis of service work introduces the idea of feeling rules, which are shared standards used to determine what is "rightly owed" in contexts of interaction, and shows how workers engage in "emotion management" to meet these expectations. Hochschild's ethnography of flight attendants documents techniques intended to align inner states with organisational demands, including reframing passengers as "personal guests" and using memory-based strategies akin to method acting.

Organisations prescribe desirable feelings such as warmth or calmness and enforce constraints against irritation, fear, or aggression. Hochschild argues that the costs of such management include the risk of alienation from one's own affective life when professional expectations conflict with spontaneous responses. Professional fields also vary: service work typically requires sustained positive display, while roles involving enforcement or collection encourage the cultivation of more confrontational repertoires.

Erving Goffman's account of ritual interaction further clarifies how institutional order is sustained. His analysis highlights the centrality of "face," the ongoing mutual effort to maintain legitimacy within encounters, and shows that anticipating embarrassment is a key motivator shaping conduct.

=== Identity-based social emotion regimes ===
Whether structured around gender, sexuality, ethnicity, or shared cultural practices, identity groups develop distinctive patterns of feeling that differentiate them from surrounding contexts. R. W. Connell's framework of multiple masculinities demonstrates how emotional expectations vary within gender orders: hegemonic masculinities emphasise control, toughness, and the management of vulnerability; subordinated and marginalised masculinities organise feeling through alternative repertoires shaped by power relations and embodied practice.

Rosenwein's analysis of emotional communities also extends to identity-based groups. Because each community is characterised by a constellation of valued feelings and interpretive norms, identity groups can be viewed as overlapping emotional communities whose members share repertoires of pride, vigilance, restraint, solidarity, or dignity.

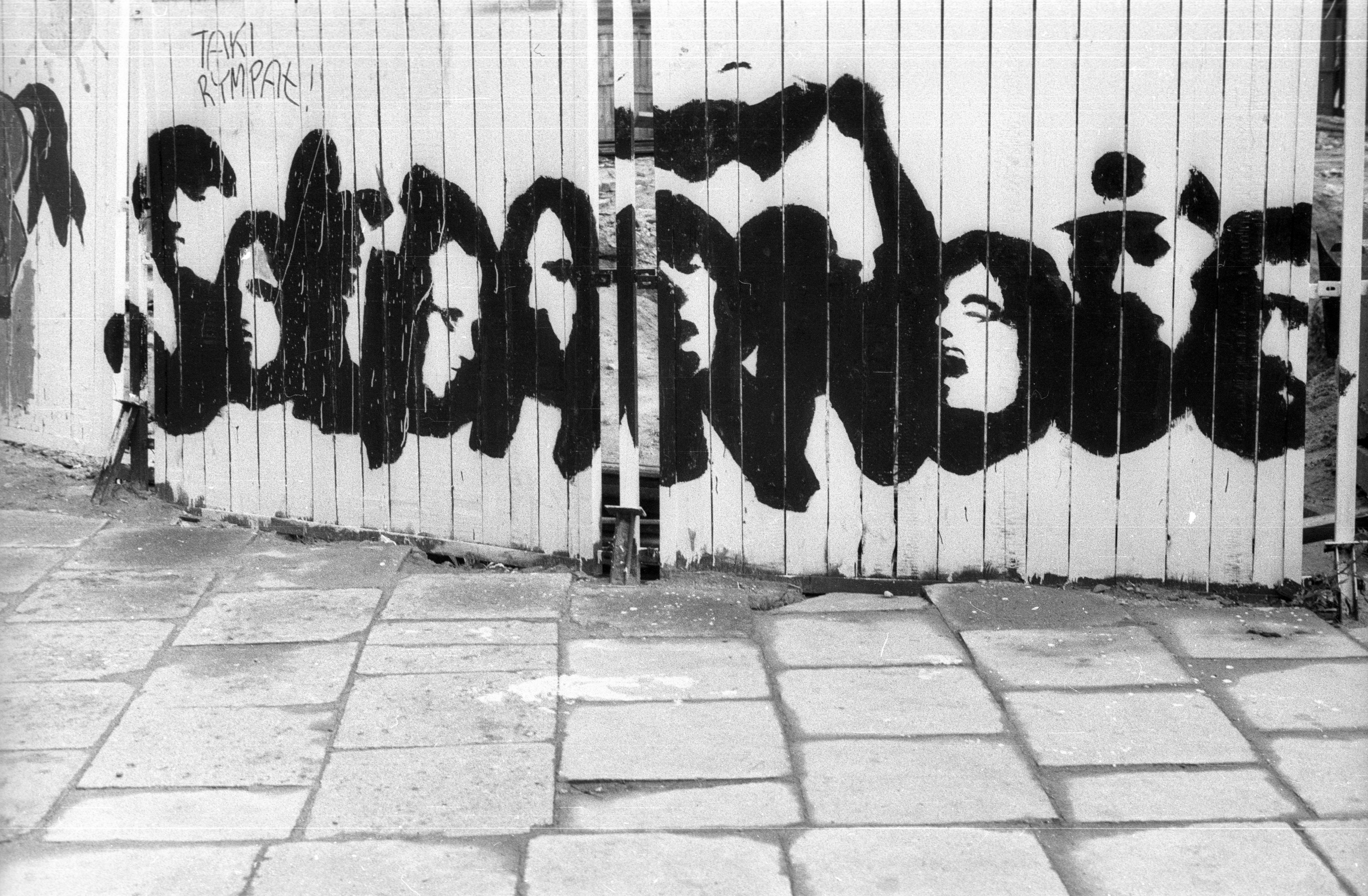
Solidarity graffiti mural in Warsaw, 1989

Jeff Goodwin, James Jasper, and Francesca Polletta's work on social movements shows how identity groups mobilise distinctive patterns of feeling they call repertoires such as anger, fear, outrage, or hope to reinforce boundaries and sustain collective engagement. The term "repertoires of contention" is used by writers such as Charles Tilly while others describe it as movement "dramaturgy" which typically refers to distinctive forms of emotion management to maintain group cohesion and interpret threats.

=== Religious and secular emotion regimes ===
Religious settings have extensively structured shared patterns of feeling shaped through ritual, doctrine, and communal practice. Rosenwein's framework shows how monastic, ecclesiastical, and lay communities cultivated constellations of valued feelings and modes of expression, forming distinctive emotional communities grounded in shared theological and moral understandings.

Monique Scheer's work demonstrates that secular institutions generate institutionally-shaped patterns of feeling analogous in analytic form to those found in religious groups. In her account of "secular embodiments," Scheer argues that norms governing affective comportment are embedded in embodied practices, spaces, and classificatory schemes that guide how people feel and perceive in secular contexts. These expectations operate through techniques of bodily discipline, sensory ordering, and ritualised routines that normalise particular affective orientations. Scheer's practice-theoretical approach emphasises that religious and secular feeling norms should not be understood as static; they are continually produced and sustained through embodied actions.

=== Subcultural and associational emotion regimes ===
Subcultures, clubs, activist groups, and other voluntary associations often maintain distinctive repertoires of feeling that sustain group identity and solidarity. Rosenwein's model suggests that such formations can be conceptualised as emotional communities whose boundaries are defined by shared assumptions, valued emotions, and norms of expression.

Academic studies of social movements by Goodwin, Jasper, and Polletta demonstrate how associational groups develop emotion norms that reinforce commitment and collective orientation. Their analysis also demonstrates that "emotion management" occurs at the collective level: groups promote shared feeling rules, deploy dramaturgical practices, and structure interactions in ways that heighten solidarity and shape responses to risk or conflict.

== Political emotion regimes ==
=== National emotion regimes ===
Writers in the field who analyse nation-states through the lens of emotion regimes emphasise how political communities organise attachments, loyalties and anxieties around the category of national belonging. Sociologist Mabel Berezin argues that modern nation-states act as "vehicles of political emotion", transforming citizenship from a formal status into a "felt identity" through practices that cultivate patriotism and nationalism, define friends and enemies, and generate "love for the nation" and a sense of fraternity among citizens.

Berezin situates national identification within a "hierarchy of felt identity", in which some collective affiliations acquire the status of "hypergoods" that command especially intense attachment. Nation-states work to secure such a privileged position for national belonging by constructing national cultures against local or regional ones and by building a material and institutional infrastructure using schools, standardized languages, rituals, and monuments to guide citizens towards experiencing themselves as members of a national community. Wars of unification and state-building in the nineteenth century, for example, helped to make national identity salient among competing loyalties.

Historical work on what Ute Frevert calls "emotional politics" in Europe's "long nineteenth century" shows how such national emotion regimes were stabilised through appeals to love, honour and fraternity. Frevert describes how revolutionary and post-revolutionary actors in France mobilised fraternity as a political bond, imagining the nation as a "band of brothers" and enacting this kinship through embodied practices such as walking arm-in-arm and public embraces. These practices aimed to remake citizens' sentiments so that political judgement became guided by a rapid, quasi-instinctive sense of what was "morally" or politically right, with emotions doing the work of directing opinions and sustaining democratic commitments. Taken together, such analyses portray national emotion regimes as historically contingent arrangements in which states and political elites cultivate specific repertoires of pride, love, honour and solidarity in order to secure legitimacy and organise the boundaries of national membership.

=== Populist emotion regimes ===
Populist movements rely on distinctive repertoires of feeling that define "the people" and their antagonists through patterned expectations of resentment, betrayal, righteous anger, and solidarity. Analysts of social movements highlight how political action is sustained by affective orientations that circulate among participants and are reinforced through collective practices. Goodwin, Jasper, and Polletta note that emotional responses such as anger, fear, and a sense of betrayal play a decisive role in mobilization, shaping whether individuals join movements and how they interpret political opportunities.

Populist organizing often depends on intensifying these feelings of threat and grievance. Goodwin and colleagues describe how narratives of injustice, loss, or danger can galvanize potential supporters and cause their actions to appear more meaningful, especially when paired with affective affiliation to symbols, leaders, and imagined communities. Movements also draw upon what the authors call "emotion cultures". Historical cases show how earlier mobilizations, including Black nationalist movements in the United States, left a legacy of "politics of rage" that later movements could adopt or adapt.

At the same time, the internal dynamics of populist groups require forms of affective regulation. Goodwin and Pfaff observe that maintaining loyalty and dedication often involves the emotion management of cultivating pride and enthusiasm while managing fear or ambivalence.

Lauren Berlant's analysis of contemporary politics shows how populist formations emerge from conditions of affective impasse in situations in which established norms and expectations no longer provide orientation. Berlant describes the contemporary present as structured by crisis and uncertainty, producing a search for clarity and attachment amid the "waning of genre" and the destabilization of established ways of making sense of the world. In such conditions, populist actors can articulate compelling narratives that convert diffuse anxieties into political resentment and promise a restoration of agency or belonging. Berlant's account helps explain why contradictory attachments that she terms "cruel optimism" can flourish in populist settings, as supporters cling to political promises that cannot be fulfilled yet remain affectively compelling.

Taken together, these analyses show that populist emotion regimes organize political life through patterned expressions of grievance and hope. They mobilize supporters by cultivating indignation toward perceived enemies, forging solidarity within "the people," and sustaining engagement through narratives that resonate with widespread feelings of insecurity and loss.

=== Authoritarian and fascist affective orders ===
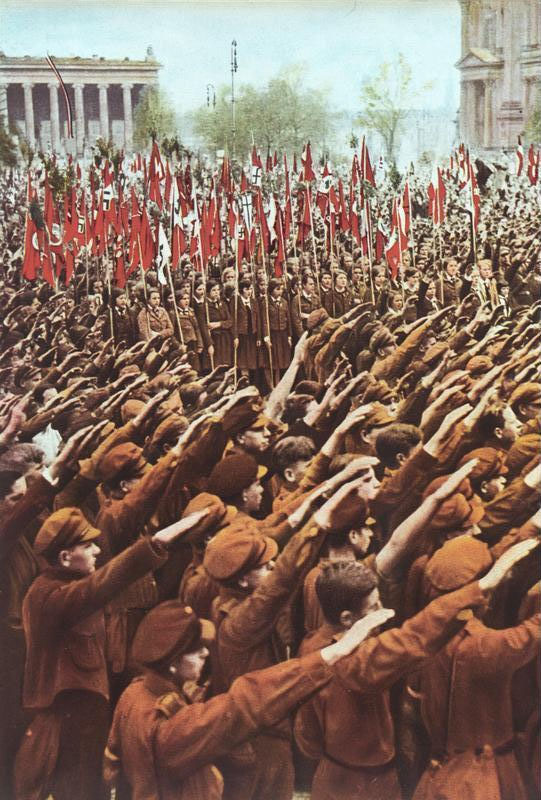
Hitler Youth performing the Nazi salute during a state-organised ritual

Authoritarian and fascist systems exemplify political orders in which regimes attempt to structure patterns of obedience, loyalty, and hostility through sustained affective practices. Berezin's study of interwar Italy demonstrates how fascist authorities sought to reshape public life by embedding political meaning in ritual action. Fascist public spectacle, which she describes as the "expressive crucible" of identity, was designed to produce a community of feeling in which Italians would experience themselves as fascists through repeated participation in schools, party organizations, and mass events. These rituals aimed to fuse individual and collective identities by generating familiarity with fascist symbols, synchronizing participants' gestures, and creating shared memories of collective presence.

According to Berezin, fascist parades and commemorations functioned as arenas of identity formation, where repeated actions elicited sensations of "we are all here together" sentiments of solidarity and produced a sense of belonging that transcended everyday social divisions. At the same time, the regime presented fascist "heroes" as constructed exemplary figures whose obituary biographies modelled virtues of bravery, stoicism, discipline, and obedience. Berezin also notes that the identities fostered by fascist cultural policy were fragile. Decades of schooling and spectacle did not produce a deeply rooted fascist self, and these identities collapsed rapidly when the regime fell.

Aho's analysis of enemy construction complements this account by identifying how authoritarian movements rely on hostility to unify supporters. He argues that societies create enemies as objects onto which fears and grievances are projected, and that this process serves to bind groups together by providing a shared target for aggression. The construction of the enemy generates a sense of threat, justifies coercion, and channels collective anger toward outsiders or internal opponents.

Appadurai's analysis of "predatory identities" shows how movements such as Nazism defined national belonging by constructing minorities as dangers to the wholeness of the nation. This dynamic is intensified through what he calls the "narcissism of minor differences," where small cultural distinctions can provoke disproportionate hostility and lead to violent purification projects.

Taken together, these academics reveal how authoritarian and fascist affective orders operate through coercion and sustained efforts to instill feelings such as obedience and pride, staging rituals that model ideal forms of belonging, and constructing enemies whose perceived threat legitimizes the regime's power.

=== Political backlash and counter-regimes ===
Periods of political transition often produce competing structures of feeling as groups respond to perceived losses of status, security, or moral orientation. Appadurai argues that modern nation-states are marked by an "anxiety of incompleteness," a pervasive sense that national identity is fragile and vulnerable to internal or external threats. This anxiety can intensify during social or political change, generating backlash movements that reinterpret uncertainty as evidence of minority danger or elite betrayal. When boundaries between "us" and "them" blur, small cultural distinctions can be magnified into sources of rage that Appadurai terms the "narcissism of minor differences." Aho shows that groups often construct enemies as repositories for diffuse anxieties and grievances.

These dynamics can crystallize counter-regimes: collective efforts to reassert threatened hierarchies of belonging through hostility, exclusion, or violence. Counter-regimes emerge when groups collectively reinterpret insecurity as injustice, identify enemies who threaten the imagined community, and articulate alternative structures of feeling meant to restore order or hierarchy.

Backlash movements also mobilize highly patterned repertoires of feeling. Goodwin, Jasper, and Polletta show that indignation, moral outrage, and fear are central to how groups interpret political developments and decide whether to engage in collective action.

In her account of contemporary political life, Berlant describes the present as structured by affective "impasse," a condition in which established norms no longer guide action or aspiration. In these moments, contradictory attachments and frustrated expectations can become politically volatile. Backlash movements harness these uncertainties by offering simplified narratives that promise moral clarity, restored agency, or renewed belonging. Berlant explains how these narratives maintain their appeal even when their solutions prove unattainable through his concept of the "cruel optimism" of attachments to promises that cannot be fulfilled yet remain affectively compelling.

=== Techniques of affective governance ===
Political institutions actively organise public feeling and direct it through patterned techniques of governance. Berezin's account of the "secure state" highlights how modern governments rely on affective strategies to cultivate legitimacy, manage uncertainty, and bind citizens to national projects. She shows that states facing crises of geopolitical, economic, or cultural security seek to generate public confidence and loyalty by embedding political messages in symbols, rituals, and communicative practices that make the state appear protective and cohesive.

A central mechanism of affective governance involves public ritual and commemoration. Berezin's earlier research on fascist Italy demonstrates how authoritarian governments used repeated public events to reshape hierarchies of identity and produce a felt sense of unity. Ritual action synchronised bodies, generated familiarity with political symbols, and produced collective memories that naturalised state authority.

Affective governance also operates through the management of fear and insecurity. Appadurai suggests that nation-states and political actors can mobilise anxieties about incompleteness, cultural threat, or minority danger to consolidate authority. He argues that feelings of uncertainty, particularly in contexts where identity boundaries appear porous, make the public more receptive to the notion that violence, exclusion, or illiberal policies are necessary for protection.

Berlant's analysis of crisis further clarifies how states intervene in affective life. She describes the contemporary public as living through conditions of ongoing "impasse," in which the familiar structures of feelings that helped people orient themselves falter and individuals struggle to orient themselves. In such contexts, state messaging, media campaigns, and political rhetoric can provide simplified affective anchors of moralised narratives of threat and rescue, promises of restored stability, or symbolic gestures of care.

Finally, affective governance includes the production and regulation of enemies. Aho demonstrates that identifying and narrating enemies helps unify the public by externalising danger and consolidating in-group solidarity.

The techniques that political authorities attempt to regulate public feeling through, such as rituals, commemoration, propaganda, crisis narration, and enemy construction, help produce and sustain political structures by shaping how citizens experience security, belonging, and threat.

== Digital emotion regimes ==
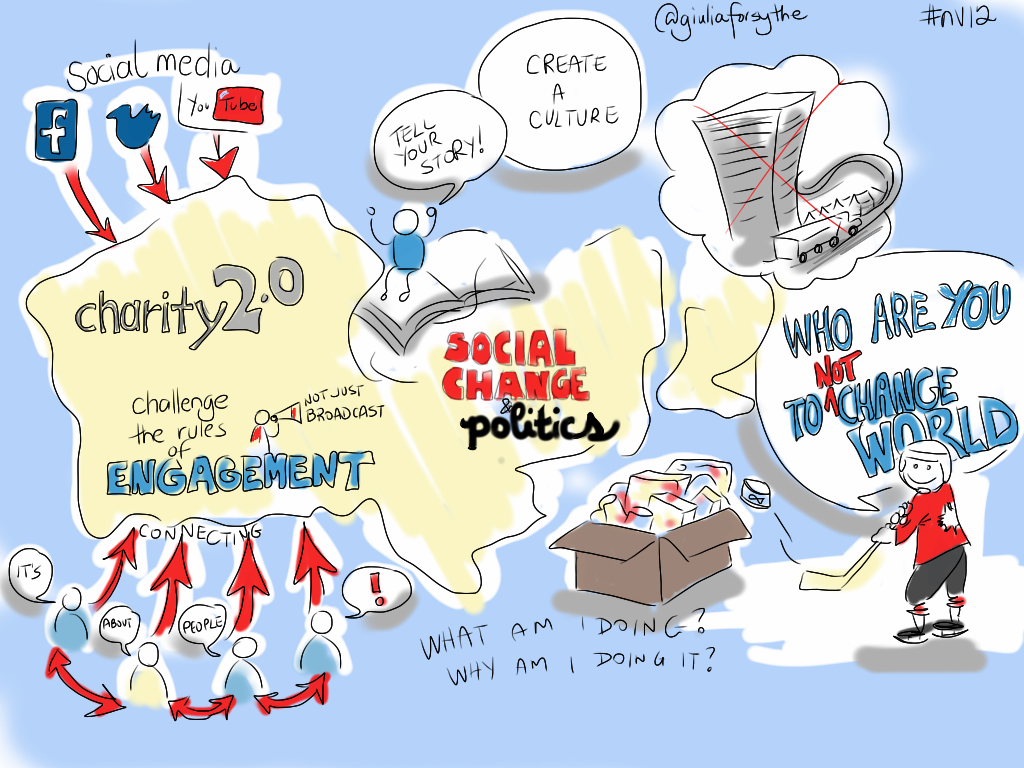
One conceptual model of platform interaction highlighting how social media systems steer users toward emotionally resonant storytelling that fuels engagement and reinforces emergent digital affective orders.

=== Algorithmic affective infrastructure ===
Digital platforms rely on algorithmic systems that sort, rank, and render information visible, thereby structuring the conditions under which users appear, circulate, and participate online. Taina Bucher argues that algorithms operate as mechanisms of selection that "make decisions, sort, and make meaningfully visible" data.

Platform architecture intensifies these effects by organizing visibility in uneven and contingent ways. The software environments that users act in are designed to make things "visible and knowable in a specific way". On Facebook, for example, the governing force is a "threat of invisibility": users confront a scarcity of visibility and must orient their conduct to the platform's embedded logic to appear at all.

Algorithmic power, in this context, exceeds the technical instructions that drive ranking or recommendation. Drawing on a broadly Foucauldian understanding, Bucher shows that algorithmic systems constitute an "ensemble of strategies" that help produce certain forms of acting and knowing.

Bucher terms the interpretive framework that emerges from these encounters the "algorithmic imaginary." Algorithms "seize the social imaginary through the various affective encounters of which they are part," generating "different experiences, moods, and sensations". The algorithmic imaginary consists of the ways people imagine what algorithms are, how they work, and what kinds of possibilities or risks they entail.

Papacharissi's account of "affective publics", which coalesce around unfolding events, complements this perspective by showing how a digitally-mediated public emerges through the circulation of shared sentiment. These dynamics demonstrate how algorithmically-mediated environments facilitate the emergence of a fluid, sentiment-driven public whose coherence depends on the affective patterns generated through networked communication.

=== Influencer economies and affective labor ===
Influencer cultures operate within visibility-driven environments in which personal presentation, mediated intimacy, and audience engagement are structured by platform architecture and market expectations. Illouz argues that digital environments extend the commodification of intimacy, as users develop self-presentations shaped by therapeutic discourse and market-oriented norms of self-realization. Online self-branding amplifies these dynamics, since platforms encourage forms of ontological self-presentation in which visibility, emotional expressiveness, and responsiveness become key components of self-making.

Banet-Weiser shows that these dynamics are embedded in a wider "economy of visibility," in which contemporary cultures of empowerment depend on producing content that circulates across media platforms. Within this economy, self-branding becomes an expected practice, linked to highly individualized discourses of self-confidence, body positivity, and personal achievement.

Abidin demonstrates that influencers work simultaneously within an attention economy and an "economy of affect," in which cultivating emotional connection with audiences is as important as attracting views or clicks. Platform metrics of "likes", comments, and follower counts are quantifiable indicators of this affective performance and strongly shape how influencers produce content.

Abidin describes the monitoring of performance across platforms, the documentation of engagement metrics, and the persistent creation of posts as demanding forms of visibility labor. At the same time, influencers rely on what Abidin calls "calibrated amateurism": a carefully-managed aesthetic of spontaneity and informality that instills a sense of authenticity and relatability amongst followers.

As Banet-Weiser and Miltner note, women who achieve heightened visibility online often confront a structurally-patterned hostility, with networked misogyny emerging as a recurrent response to the very forms of self-presentation and empowerment that influencer cultures encourage.

=== Toxic subcultures, networked hostility, and affective contagion ===
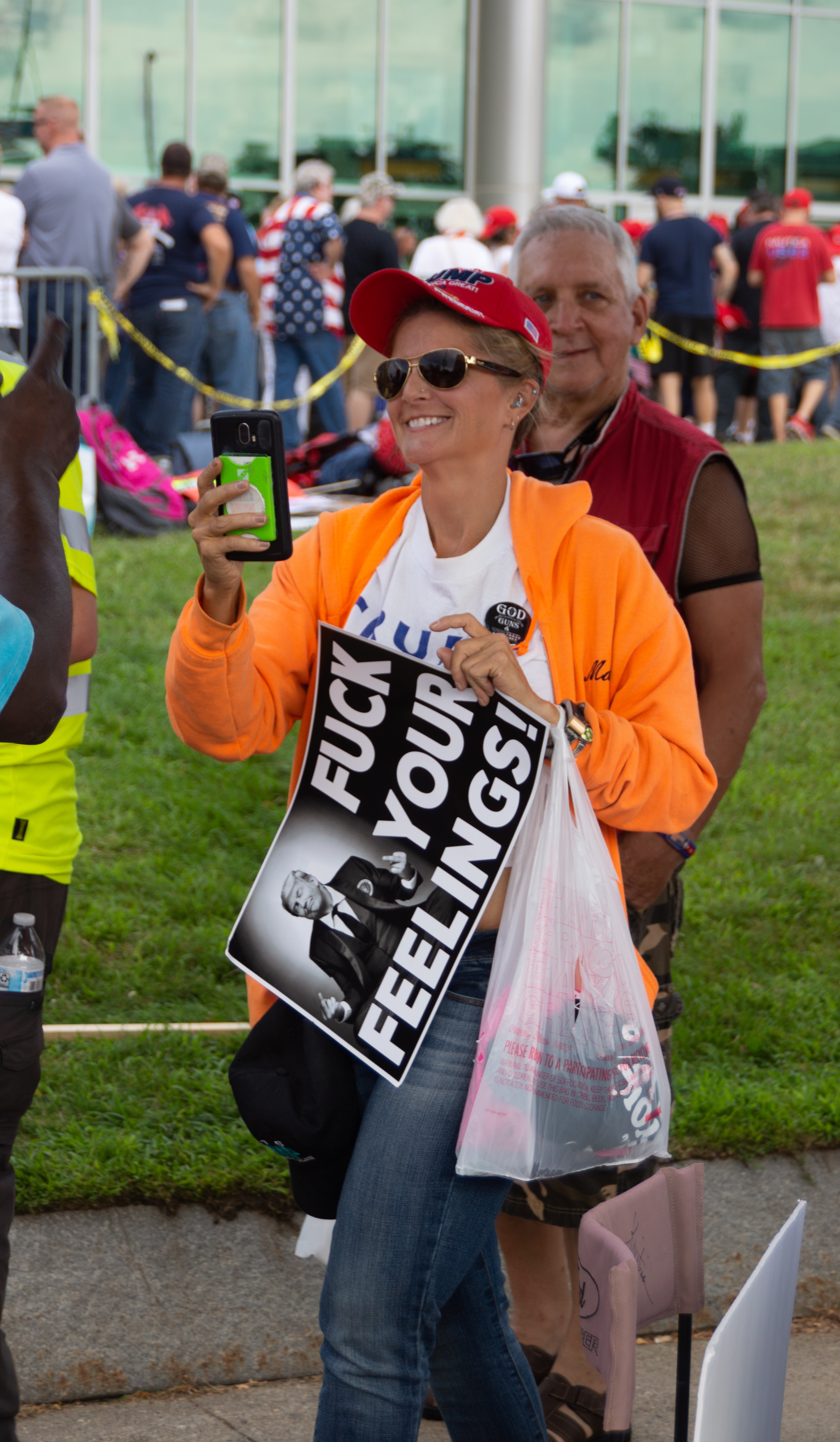
Trolling as a method of signaling shared identity as well as establishing and reinforcing collectively-held emotions

Certain online subcultures develop patterned norms of hostility that function as exclusionary emotion regimes, organizing participation through practices of provocation, ridicule, and antagonism. Whitney Phillips shows that trolling is a recognizable cultural formation structured by shared strategies and expectations. Trolls operate according to norms that guide their conduct, enact transgressive performances, and target others to generate reactions that reinforce group identity. Central to these practices is the pursuit of "lulz," a mode of pleasure rooted in the discomfort or humiliation of others, which Phillips identifies as a defining logic of troll culture. These performances often escalate through affective spirals, as hostile reactions circulate and intensify within and beyond the originating group. Irony serves as an important discursive tool, allowing participants to distance themselves from harm by framing attacks as jokes, even as the effects of harassment remain consequential. These formations resemble what Papacharissi terms affective publics: collectivities that congeal around circulating sentiment, including antagonistic or hostile affect, rather than coherent ideological commitments.

These dynamics are reinforced by collective coordination, with trolls frequently acting together to amplify the scale and impact of targeted attacks. Hostility also functions as an internal boundary-making device: communities police their norms through derision and targeted harassment, using exclusionary practices to establish who belongs and who does not. Systems organized around visibility and amplification reward content that provokes strong reactions.

Banet-Weiser and Miltner characterize "networked misogyny" as a structural force in online environments, rather than an anomaly or the product of individual deviance. They argue that highly visible women, particularly those associated with feminist politics, encounter patterned hostility intensified by the affordances and cultures of digital platforms. These responses often combine resentment, antagonism, and gendered derision, and are amplified through technical infrastructure that facilitates rapid circulation and escalation. Such hostility is also unevenly distributed: women of color disproportionately become targets of racialized and gendered harassment. In her broader analysis of popular misogyny, Banet-Weiser argues that misogyny "folds into state and national structures with terrible efficiency".

=== Image circulation, digital witnessing, and affective publics ===
Kari Andén-Papadopoulos shows that activist image-making in the Arab uprisings involved "citizen camera-witnessing," a set of embodied practices through which protesters used cameras to assert political presence and reclaim representational power from authoritarian regimes. Filming demonstrations became a means of transforming participants from subjects of repression into agents capable of documenting state violence and articulating collective demands. As eyewitness images circulated across digital platforms, they mobilized a transnational public and provided visual documentation of political struggle.

Papacharissi conceptualizes these forms of circulation as the work of "affective publics," collectivities that arise through shared, event-driven sentiment rather than through stable organizational norms. Such publics are fluid and episodic, forming around moments of heightened visibility and dissolving as events recede. These practices also generated highly visible, affectively charged communicative forms. Activist videos recorded during protests or conflict documented suffering and atrocity, becoming key materials for human rights work and for forming communities oriented around witnessing and accountability. Grassroots videographers increasingly found their work incorporated into what Andén-Papadopoulos calls a post-2011 "image-as-forensic-evidence" economy, wherein videos were assessed, preserved, and repurposed according to evidentiary standards established by international justice actors.

YouTube's introduction of automated machine-learning deletion systems in 2017 led to the removal of hundreds of thousands of Syria-related videos. Activists emphasized the vulnerability created by these systems, noting both the absence of meaningful communication with platform operators and the structural dependence that Kazansky terms "forced reliance" on commercial platforms that simultaneously provide visibility and expose users to sudden loss of archives.

Record-keeping itself carries "highly charged" significance for videographers, who often understand documentation as a form of resistance to erasure and as a means of sustaining the history of movements that face state repression. Several Syrian participants described the act of filming as essential to maintaining the possibility of justice and collective memory. In this sense, affective publics illustrate how digital witnessing organizes collective feeling around recorded events.

=== Platform governance as affective governance ===
Bucher argues that algorithms function as mechanisms of governance by determining what becomes perceptible in the first place, as they "make decisions, sort, and make meaningfully visible" information. Algorithmic power operates as an "ensemble of strategies" that shapes how people act and what kinds of knowledge practices become possible on platforms. These processes are rooted in platform architecture that allocates visibility unevenly: the "im/material" spaces of software make things visible "in a specific way," and the dominant force shaping user conduct is the "threat of invisibility," as visibility itself becomes scarce and contingent upon alignment with platform logics. Because governance is embedded in technical infrastructure, it is also experienced affectively. Algorithms "seize the social imaginary through various affective encounters".

Phillips demonstrates how these infrastructural dynamics intersect with moderation practices to shape hostile or antagonistic climates. Platform architecture, which rewards intensity and attention, create conditions in which trolling and harassment thrive. Efforts to regulate antagonism often prompt new forms of evasion: trolls respond to moderation by adapting their strategies. Irony functions as a discursive shield that enables harmful speech to persist despite policy restrictions.

Banet-Weiser and Miltner identify "networked misogyny" as a structural phenomenon linked to the cultures and affordances of platforms, which facilitate the rapid circulation and amplification of hostile content. Women, especially women of color, are disproportionately exposed to these forms of harassment because platform infrastructures mediate visibility in ways that reproduce offline inequalities. Banet-Weiser further argues that misogyny is deeply embedded in broader cultural structures, making antagonism toward visible feminist expression both predictable and systemically reinforced.

=== Gendered and racialized digital emotion regimes ===
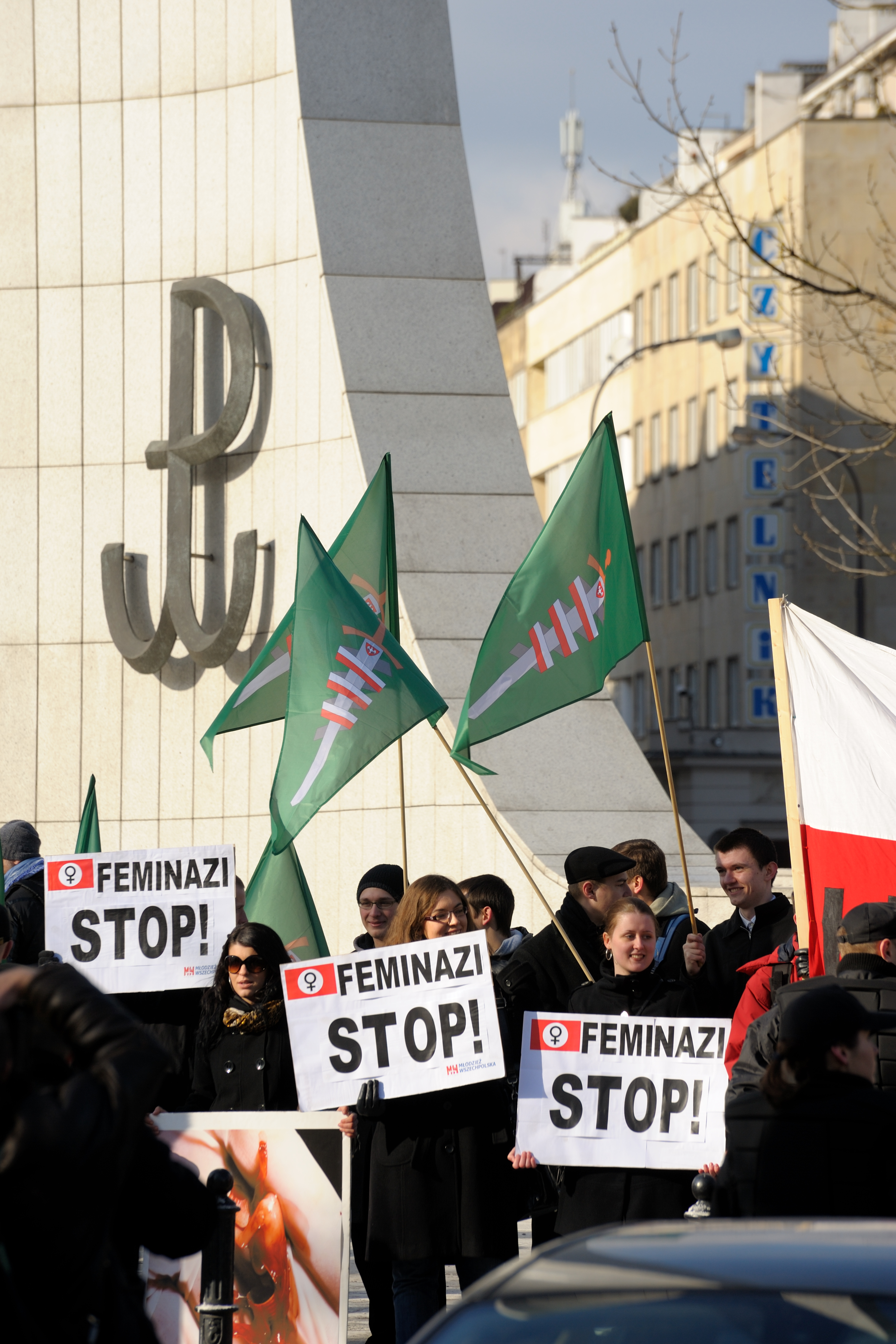
Antifeminist demonstrators in Warsaw using extremist imagery

Banet-Weiser and Miltner show that networked misogyny is a structural formation embedded in the technological, social, and economic infrastructure of platforms. Hostile responses to feminist or female-coded visibility, such as those directed at participants in the #MasculinitySoFragile debate, demonstrate how antagonism becomes a predictable reaction, shaped by platform affordances and cultural narratives surrounding gender and power. The origins of this debate, which included explicit reference to racialized violence against Black men, also reveal how gendered discourses online are intertwined with racialized injury and affective vulnerability.

In her broader account, Banet-Weiser argues that misogyny circulates as a "networked structure," linking disparate groups and discourses across platforms through shared vocabularies of injury, entitlement, and hostility. Terms such as "incel," "negging," and "Men Going Their Own Way" form a linguistic repertoire that consolidates gendered hierarchies and legitimizes antagonistic interaction. This networked system of misogyny intensifies the risks associated with visibility for women and girls, who often encounter harassment, denigration, and racialized or sexualized hostility when they participate in public digital spaces. Popular feminism's emphasis on visibility becomes fraught in this context, as increased visibility can generate both recognition and intensified backlash.

These dynamics are particularly pronounced in youth-oriented digital practices. Banet-Weiser describes how YouTube genres such as "Am I Pretty?" videos expose girls to a climate of judgment and potential bullying, in which self-presentation is evaluated through norms that fuse popularity, appearance, and vulnerability. The affective expectations of confidence, self-esteem and resilience embedded in these practices are unevenly distributed, with girls disproportionately subjected to scrutiny and potential harm.

Racialized inequalities also shape how digital communities form and circulate. Andén-Papadopoulos notes that visibility in global media systems is structured unevenly, with Western journalistic frameworks exerting strong control over the interpretation of eyewitness imagery from marginalized regions. These inequalities are compounded by platform governance: automated content moderation disproportionately harms marginalized users, such as Syrian videographers whose documentation of violence was inadvertently erased by algorithmic deletion systems.

== Related terms ==
=== Emotional communities ===
Scholars commonly distinguish William Reddy's notion of an emotion regime from Barbara Rosenwein's concept of emotional communities, as each highlights different scales and emphases in the study of patterned feeling. Rosenwein defines emotional communities as groups whose members share characteristic norms for evaluating and expressing feelings in vocabularies, interpretive habits, and valued dispositions that shape how situations are understood and responded to within the group. Her work concerns plurality: any society contains multiple communities, each developing its own expected feelings and sanctioned expressions.

Reddy's account of emotion regimes focuses on the prescriptive structures that organize feeling across a social order. As forms of expression that simultaneously describe and help produce feelings, configurations of obligatory emotives make up an emotion regime together with the institutionalized practices that these conventions are reinforced through. Although many of Reddy's historical examples concern political systems and state authority, the underlying conceptual apparatus is scalable. Emotion regimes may be found in nation-states and political systems (macro), in organisations and professional settings (meso), and in movements, subcultures, or other collectivities (micro to meso) whenever norms of affect are prescriptive, socially enforced, and tied to shared expectations about appropriate conduct.

The distinction between the two terms therefore lies in emphasis rather than categorical separation. Emotional communities describe the shared repertoires and interpretive practices of particular groups. Emotion regimes refer to structured normative orders, sometimes broad, sometimes local, that cultivate, reward, and regulate specific forms of feeling. While community emphasises diversity within a social landscape, regime highlights the degree of prescription and the ways in which expectations of feeling shape action and constrain emotional possibility.

=== Feeling rules / emotion work ===
Arlie Hochschild's concepts of feeling rules and emotion work describe the socially patterned expectations that guide which feelings individuals should experience or display in particular situations. Feeling rules constitute "the side of ideology that deals with emotion and feeling," indicating what one "ought to" or has the "right to" feel in a given context. Individuals perform emotion work when they attempt to shape their affect in accordance with these expectations. Such expectations operate at many levels across families, workplaces, professions, and social classes where they differ according to gender, task, and role.

Organizations may also institutionalize feeling rules. In The Managed Heart, Hochschild shows how employers in service industries train workers to display prescribed affects such as cheerfulness, embedding these expectations in occupational routines.

Reddy's historical studies show how dominant conventions such as the courtly order of salon politesse or later sentimental conventions shaped expression and conduct during the French Revolution. The concept, however, is not limited to political systems. Emotion regimes can characterize institutions, organizations, movements, and other collectivities whenever expectations of feeling are prescriptive, socially reinforced, and tied to shared practices. When mandatory emotives restrict individuals' room for self-revision, they may contribute to emotional suffering.

=== Affective economies / emotional capitalism ===
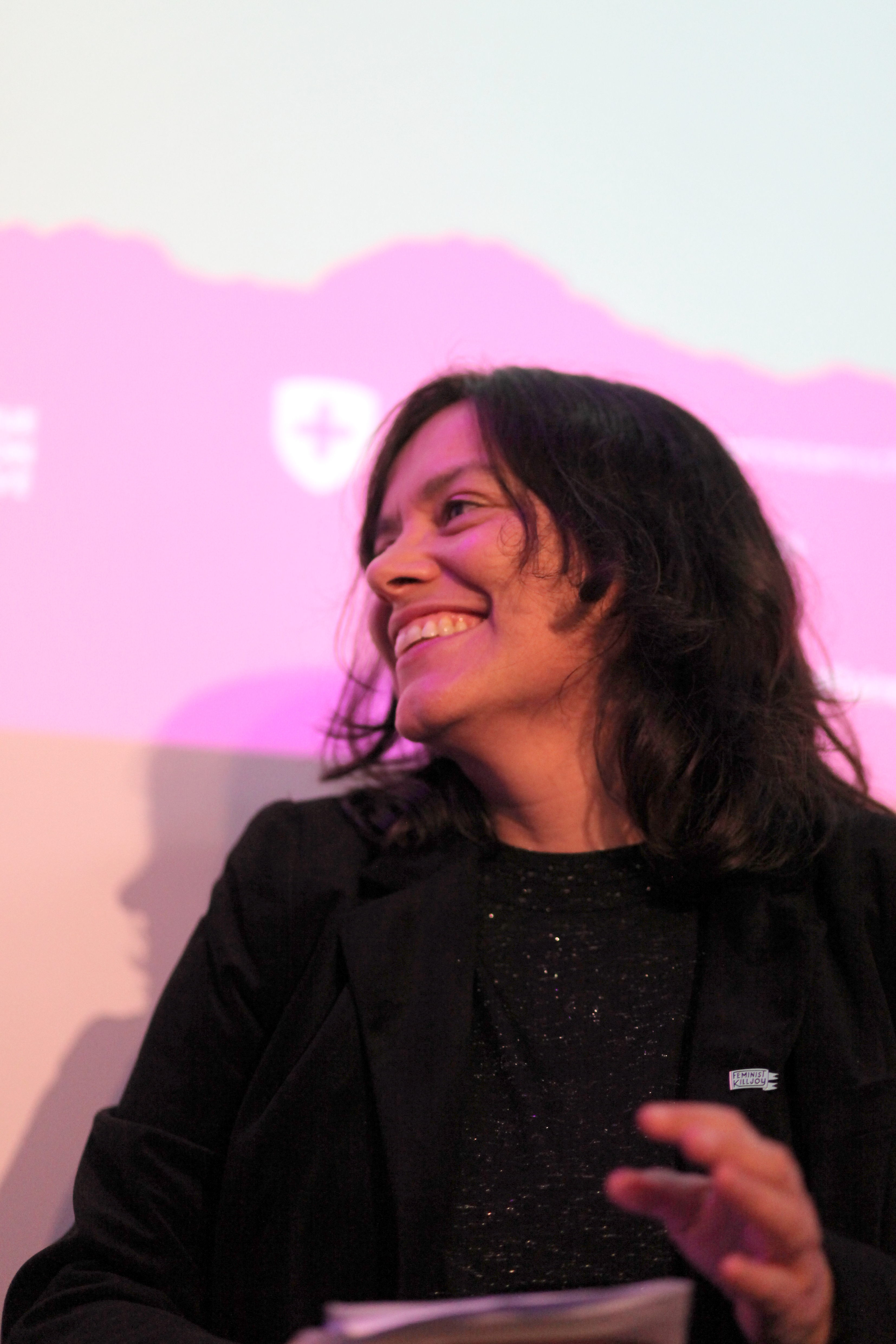
Sara Ahmed, a theorist of affect whose work explains how emotions circulate through communities.

Sara Ahmed's formulation of affective economies examines how feelings circulate between signs, bodies, and objects. This circulation can produce "sticky signs," whose affective charge intensifies as histories of association accumulate.

As summarized by recent historiography, capitalist institutions and cultural practices reorganize emotional life, identifying, naming, and managing affect in ways that transform aspirations, anxieties, and social relations. In this usage, emotional capitalism describes how economic rationalities and emotional expectations become intertwined across multiple settings.

Reddy's concept of an emotion regime can be applied alongside these approaches. Such regimes may operate at the scale of political systems, but they may also characterize organizations, professions, movements, and subcultures whenever affective norms are articulated, cultivated, and socially reinforced.

=== Affective publics ===
Zizi Papacharissi's concept of affective publics describes collectivities that emerge through digitally-mediated expression. These communities form as individuals share affective intensities of indignation, concern or solidarity through networked platforms. Their coherence depends less on stable group membership than on the rhythms and contours of communication afforded by digital infrastructure.

Papacharissi emphasizes that affective publics materialize through the convenience of platforms, featuring "always-on" streams of content and modalities that connect dispersed participants into emergent formations. These publics demonstrate how digital environments organize affective life by structuring visibility, circulation, and interaction, not by specifying how individuals ought to feel.

Reddy's notion of an emotion regime can be considered alongside this perspective. Emotion regimes draw attention to patterned formal and informal expectations that guide how individuals should feel and express themselves within a social formation. These expectations may be found at many scales, from political orders to organizations, professions, or digital communities, wherever norms of expression are cultivated and socially reinforced.

=== Affective governance / platform governance ===
Scholarship on digital platforms often examines how infrastructures, moderation systems, and computational processes shape the environment in which expression circulates. Tarleton Gillespie's analysis of platform governance shows that content moderation entails ongoing processes of decision-making, negotiation, and revision, as platforms determine what becomes visible, legitimate, or suppressed within their systems. Visibility itself functions as a form of governance, insofar as platforms effectively decide which participants "count" in the production of public discourse. Moderation is distributed across specialized teams whose activities influence broader knowledge and value structures, while opportunities for user participation in shaping these rules remain limited.

Taina Bucher's work highlights how algorithmic systems organize affective life by shaping what users encounter, how often, and in what order. The engineering of participation through ranking, filtering, and personalization produces distinct "affective landscapes" in which forms of attention and responsiveness are cultivated.

Reddy's concept of an emotion regime may be considered alongside these approaches. Such regimes may operate within political systems, but they can also characterize organizations, communities, professions, or digitally mediated spaces whenever affective expectations become patterned and collectively recognized.

=== Social-movement emotion cultures ===
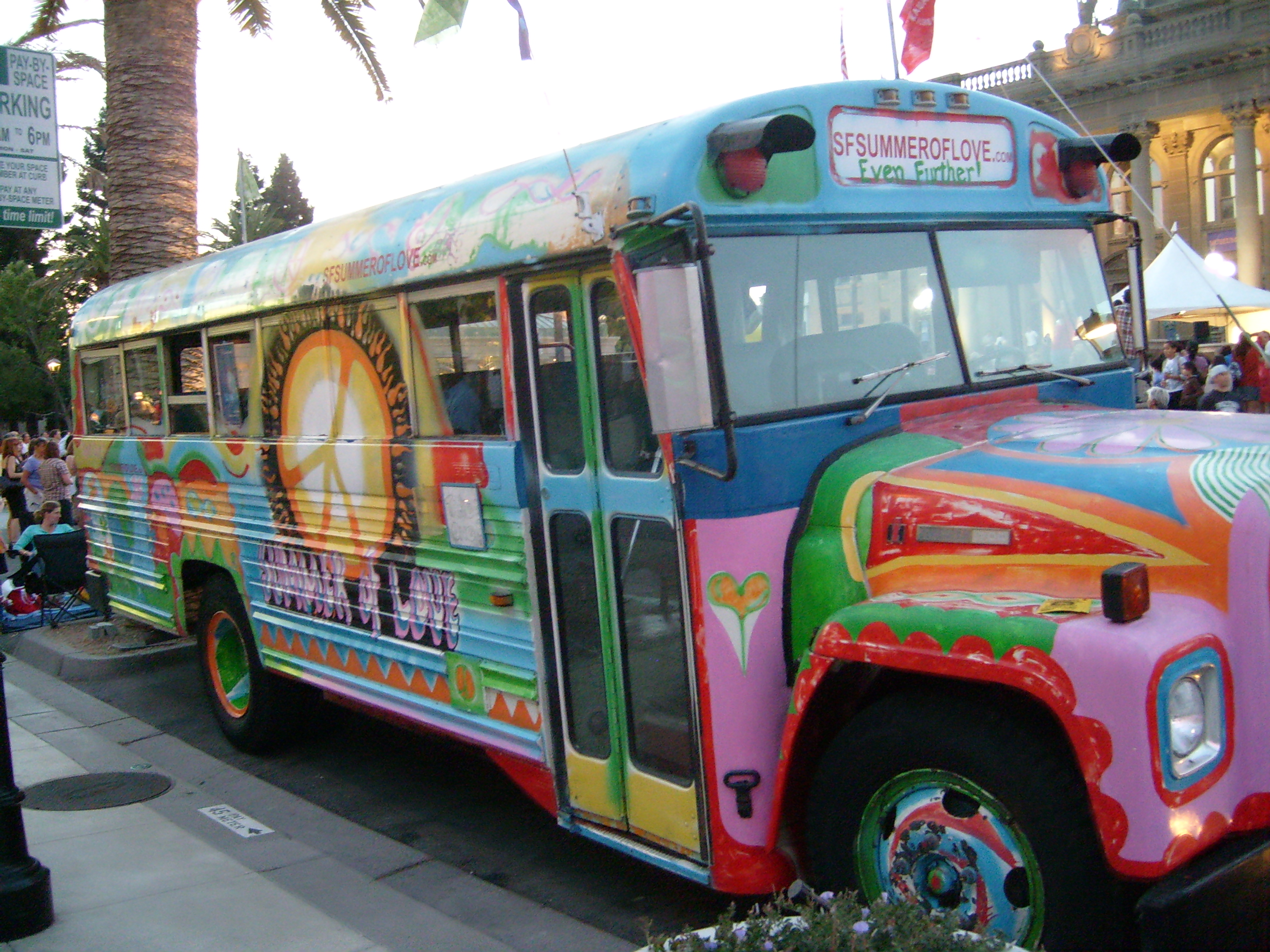
The 1967 "Summer of Love" ushered in a shift towards an subculture emotion regime based on reciprocal emotions.

Distinguished from reciprocal emotions such as affective ties of friendship, loyalty, and solidarity among participants, the authors of the book Passionate Politics draw a contrast with other shared emotions such as collective anger or outrage directed at external actors. Within these two categories, the associated forms of feeling within each repertoire reinforce one another, providing the cultural and motivational grounding for protest and sustaining continued participation. Recruitment itself often depends on affective ties, as social networks carry expectations of liking, trust, and obligation.

Social movements also cultivate emotionally charged narratives, metaphors, and symbols that structure meaning and solidarity. Anne Kane's work shows that emotional meanings are organized through interpretive frameworks embedded in cultural and historical contexts. Researchers have noted that community-organizing models associated with Saul Alinsky rely on humour, ridicule, and dramatized indignation to build solidarity and encourage collective agency, demonstrating how affective repertoires function as practical tools of mobilisation as well as elements of a movement's emotional culture. Michael Young's analysis of moral shock highlights how intense reactive feelings can resonate with enduring commitments and motivate political engagement. High-risk activism frequently involves processes that help participants manage fear, such as rituals and collective identities that foster courage and continuity.

These features illustrate how movements generate affective cultures that shape interpretation, action, and belonging, and may also exhibit prescriptive or expectation-setting qualities, whether through shared norms of indignation, narratives valorizing courage, or practices that discipline members' emotional styles. In this sense, a movement's emotional formation can resemble an emotion regime when norms are articulated, cultivated, and socially reinforced. At the same time, the analytic lens of movement emotion cultures draws particular attention to expressive repertoires, solidarity-building practices, and the dynamic rechanneling of emotions in moments of contestation.

== Bibliography ==
=== Books ===
- Abidin, Crystal (2018). Internet Celebrity: Understanding Fame Online. Howard House: Emerald Publishing. ISBN 978-1-78756-079-6.
- Ahmed, Sara (2004). The Cultural Politics of Emotion. Edinburgh University Press. ISBN 978-0-7486-9113-5.
- Aho, James A. (1994). This Thing of Darkness: A Sociology of the Enemy. Seattle: University of Washington Press. ISBN 0-295-97386-2.
- Appadurai, Arjun (2006). Fear of Small Numbers: An Essay on the Geography of Anger. Durham: Duke University Press. ISBN 978-0-8223-3845-1.
- Banet-Weiser, Sarah (2018). Empowered: Popular Feminism and Popular Misogyny. Durham: Duke University Press. ISBN 978-1-4780-0291-8.
- Berezin, Mabel (1997). Making the Fascist Self: The Political Culture of Interwar Italy. Ithaca: Cornell University Press. ISBN 0-8014-8420-0.
- Berlant, Lauren (2011). Cruel Optimism. Durham: Duke University Press. ISBN 978-0-8223-5111-5.
- Berezin, Mabel (2001). "Emotions and Political Identity". In Goodwin, Jeff; Jasper, James M.; Polletta, Francesca (eds.). Passionate Politics: Emotions and Social Movements. Chicago: University of Chicago Press. ISBN 978-0-226-30400-7.
- Bucher, Taina (2018). If…Then: Algorithmic Power and Politics. New York: Oxford University Press. ISBN 978-0-19-049303-5.
- Connell, Robert W. (2020). Masculinities. Berkeley: University of California Press. ISBN 978-0-520-24698-0.
- Frevert, Ute (2014). Emotional Lexicons: Continuity and Change in the Vocabulary of Feeling 1700–2000. Oxford: Oxford University Press. ISBN 978-0-19-965573-1.
- Frevert, Ute (2024). Writing the History of Emotions: Concepts and Practices. Oxford: Oxford University Press. ISBN 978-0-19-289579-0.
- Gillespie, Tarleton (2018). Custodians of the Internet: Platforms, Content Moderation, and the Hidden Decisions That Shape Social Media. New Haven: Yale University Press. ISBN 978-0-300-23502-9.
- Goffman, Erving (1982). Interaction Ritual: Essays on Face-to-Face Behavior. New York: Pantheon Books. ISBN 0-394-70631-5.
- Goodwin, Jeff; Jasper, James M.; Polletta, Francesca (2001). "Introduction: Why Emotions Matter". In Goodwin, Jeff; Jasper, James M.; Polletta, Francesca (eds.). Passionate Politics: Emotions and Social Movements. Chicago: University of Chicago Press. pp. 1–24. ISBN 978-0-226-30400-7.
- Hochschild, Arlie Russell (2012). The Managed Heart: Commercialization of Human Feeling. Berkeley: University of California Press. ISBN 978-0-520-27294-1.
- Illouz, Eva (2007). Cold Intimacies: The Making of Emotional Capitalism. Cambridge: Polity Press. ISBN 978-0-7456-3904-8.
- Papacharissi, Zizi (2015). Affective Publics: Sentiment, Technology, and Politics. New York: Oxford University Press. ISBN 978-0-19-999973-6.
- Phillips, Whitney (2015). This Is Why We Can't Have Nice Things. Cambridge, MA: MIT Press. ISBN 978-0-262-02894-3.
- Plamper, Jan (2015). The History of Emotions: An Introduction. Oxford: Oxford University Press. ISBN 978-0-19-966833-5.
- Reddy, William M. (2001). The Navigation of Feeling: A Framework for the History of Emotions. Cambridge: Cambridge University Press. ISBN 978-0-521-00472-5.
- Rosenwein, Barbara H. (2006). Emotional Communities in the Early Middle Ages. Ithaca, NY: Cornell University Press. ISBN 978-0-8014-7416-3.
- Rosenwein, Barbara H. (2018). What Is the History of Emotions?. Cambridge: Polity Press. ISBN 978-1-5095-0849-5.
- Scheer, Monique; Johansen, Birgitte Schepelern; Fadil, Nadia (2019). "Secular Embodiments: Mapping an Emergent Field". In Scheer, Monique; Johansen, Birgitte Schepelern; Fadil, Nadia (eds.). Secular Bodies, Affects and Emotions: European Configurations. London: Bloomsbury Academic. ISBN 978-1-350-06522-2.
- Scheff, Thomas J. (1990). Microsociology: Discourse, Emotion, and Social Structure. Chicago: University of Chicago Press. ISBN 978-0-226-73350-0.

=== Journals and other sources ===
- Banet-Weiser, Sarah; Miltner, Kate M. (2016). "#MasculinitySoFragile: Culture, Structure, and Networked Misogyny". Feminist Media Studies. 16 (1): 171–174. doi:10.1080/14680777.2016.1120490.
- Andén-Papadopoulos, Kari (2020a). "Producing Image Activism After the Arab Uprisings". International Journal of Communication. 14: 5010–5020.
- Andén-Papadopoulos, Kari (2020b). "The "Image-as-Forensic-Evidence" Economy in the Post-2011 Syrian Conflict". International Journal of Communication. 14: 5072–5091.
- Fretz, Eric (2019). "The Comic Vision of Saul Alinsky's Community Organizing Tradition". Amerikastudien / American Studies. 66 (1): 1–22. doi:10.33675/AMST/2019/1/5.
- Hochschild, Arlie Russell (1979). "Emotion Work, Feeling Rules, and Social Structure". American Journal of Sociology. 85 (3): 551–575. Bibcode:1979AmJSo..85..551H. doi:10.1086/227049.
- Reddy, William M. (March 2023). "To fly the plane: language games, historical narratives, and emotions". History and Theory. 62 (1). Wiley Periodicals LLC on behalf of Wesleyan University: 30–61. doi:10.1111/hith.12289. ISSN 0018-2656.
- Scheer, Monique (2012). "Are Emotions a Kind of Practice (and Is That What Makes Them Have a History)? A Bourdieusian Approach to Understanding Emotion". History and Theory. 51 (2). Wiley for Wesleyan University: 193–220. doi:10.1111/j.1468-2303.2012.00621.x. ISSN 0018-2656. JSTOR 23277639.
