= William Reddy =

Historian of modern Europe and scholar of the history of emotions

William M. Reddy
- Born: William Matthew Reddy; June 30, 1947 (age 79)
- Citizenship: US
- Occupations: Historian, cultural anthropologist
- Known for: History of emotions; The Navigation of Feeling
- Title: William T. Laprade Distinguished Professor Emeritus of History
- Awards: Fellow of the American Academy of Arts and Sciences

Academic background
- Education: University of Chicago (B.A., M.A., Ph.D.)

Academic work
- Discipline: History; cultural anthropology
- Sub-discipline: History of emotions; modern European history
- Institutions: Duke University
- Main interests: History of emotions; political culture; modern Europe
- Notable works: The Navigation of Feeling
- Notable ideas: Emotional regimes; Emotives
- Website: scholars.duke.edu/person/wmr

William Matthew Reddy (born 30 June 1947) is a historian and cultural anthropologist of modern Europe, known for his work on the history of emotions and for developing the concepts of emotives andemotion regimes. He is William T. Laprade Distinguished Professor Emeritus of History at Duke University, where he has also held a joint appointment in cultural anthropology. Reddy is the author of The Navigation of Feeling: A Framework for the History of Emotions (2001), as well as earlier studies of political culture and economic life in modern Europe. His work has been recognised through fellowships from bodies including the John Simon Guggenheim Memorial Foundation, the Fulbright Program and the National Humanities Center, and through election to the American Academy of Arts and Sciences.

== Biography ==
=== Early life and education ===
Reddy was born William Matthew Reddy on 30 June 1947. He studied at the University of Chicago, where he received a B.A. in 1969, an M.A. in 1970 and a Ph.D. in 1974.

=== Academic career ===
After completing his doctorate, Reddy joined the Department of History at Duke University as a visiting assistant professor in 1977. He was appointed assistant professor in 1980, associate professor with tenure in 1985 and professor with tenure in 1989. From 1992 to 2017 he also held a joint appointment as professor of cultural anthropology in Duke's Trinity College of Arts & Sciences. Reddy became William T. Laprade Distinguished Professor of History in 1999 and was named William T. Laprade Distinguished Professor Emeritus of History in 2017. He served as chair of the Department of History from 2006 to 2012.

=== Research ===
Reddy's research focuses on modern European history, political culture and the history of emotions. In The Navigation of Feeling: A Framework for the History of Emotions (2001), he proposed the concepts of emotional regimes and emotives as tools for analysing how norms of feeling are organised, enforced and contested over time. His earlier monographs examined the emergence of market culture and the interplay of honour, sentiment and political change in post-revolutionary France.

William M. Reddy is widely recognized by historians of emotions as a foundational theorist whose work enabled the field to cohere conceptually and methodologically. Noted scholar Barbara Rosenwein credits Reddy as one of the key scholars who redirected attention toward historically specific norms governing feeling, contrasting her own framework of emotional communities with Reddy’s analysis of prescriptive structures shaping expression and valuation in different periods. As normative orders that authorize, cultivate, and sanction particular styles of feeling, his formulation of “emotional regimes” has become central to historiographical debates concerning affect, power, and social order. Later synthetic accounts by Ute Frevert similarly situate Reddy among the major architects of the modern history of emotions, noting that his conceptual and historical investigations helped articulate why emotional styles vary across time and why their transformation is historically consequential. These secondary analyses underscore Reddy’s influence in establishing that emotional life is neither universal nor merely psychological but fundamentally shaped by cultural and political structures.

Reddy’s impact also extends into sociological analyses of affect and collective action. Scholarship in the book Passionate Politics highlights the relevance of his insistence that emotional norms structure agency, identity, and participation in social movements . The editors argue that research on protest and political mobilisation must take seriously the patterned expectations and expressive repertoires that enable anger, indignation, joy, and solidarity to become politically meaningful. Though the volume is not primarily a commentary on Reddy, its programmatic framing adopts a view of emotions as socially organized, normatively regulated, and historically contingent. These are all positions developed systematically in Reddy’s work and taken up by sociologists exploring how movements cultivate affective attachments, manage feeling, and construct collective identities. Together these secondary sources portray Reddy as a scholar who reshaped both historical and sociological understandings of emotions by demonstrating how normative structures of feeling govern experience, expression, and political action.

== Honors ==
Reddy has received fellowships from the John Simon Guggenheim Memorial Foundation (1987), the Franco-American Commission for Educational Exchange (Fulbright, 1988) and the National Humanities Center (1995), among other organisations. He has also held fellowships from the National Endowment for the Humanities, the Social Science Research Council and research institutes including the Stanford Humanities Center and the Center for Advanced Study in the Behavioral Sciences. In 2014 he was elected a fellow of the American Academy of Arts and Sciences.

== Selected works ==
- Reddy, William M. (1984). The Rise of Market Culture: The Textile Trade and French Society, 1750–1900. Cambridge: Cambridge University Press. ISBN 9780521265249.
- Reddy, William M. (1987). Money and Liberty in Modern Europe: A Critique of Historical Understanding. New York: Cambridge University Press. ISBN 9780521322409.
- Reddy, William M. (1997a). The Invisible Code: Honor and Sentiment in Postrevolutionary France, 1815–1848. Berkeley: University of California Press. ISBN 9780520206700.
- Reddy, William M. (1997b). "Against Constructionism: The Historical Ethnography of Emotions". Current Anthropology. 38: 327–351.
- Reddy, William M. (1999). "Emotional Liberty: Politics and History in the Anthropology of Emotions". Cultural Anthropology. 14: 256–288.
- Reddy, William M. (2004) [2001]. The Navigation of Feeling: A Framework for the History of Emotions. Cambridge: Cambridge University Press. ISBN 0-521-00472-1.
- Reddy, William M. (2012). The Making of Romantic Love: Longing and Sexuality in Europe, South Asia, and Japan, 900–1200 CE. Chicago: University of Chicago Press. ISBN 9780226706283.

== Sources ==
=== Books ===
- Frevert, Ute (2024). Writing the History of Emotions: Concepts and Practices. Oxford: Oxford University Press. ISBN 9780192895790.
- Goodwin, Jeff; Jasper, James M.; Polletta, Francesca (2001). Goodwin, Jeff; Jasper, James M.; Polletta, Francesca (eds.). Passionate Politics: Emotions and Social Movements. Chicago: University of Chicago Press. ISBN 9780226304007.
- Rosenwein, Barbara H. (2006). Emotional Communities in the Early Middle Ages. Ithaca, NY: Cornell University Press. ISBN 978-0801474163.

=== Journals and other sources ===
- Duke University (n.d.c). "Academic Experience – William M. Reddy". Scholars@Duke. Duke University.
- Duke University (n.d.b). "Recognition – William M. Reddy". Scholars@Duke. Duke University.
- Duke University (n.d.a). "William M. Reddy". Scholars@Duke. Duke University.
- Duke University (n.d.d). "William M. Reddy". People.duke.edu. Duke University.
- Library of Congress (5 August 2025). "LC Name Authority File (LCNAF): Reddy, William M." Library of Congress Authorities. Library of Congress.
