= Barbara H. Rosenwein =

American historian

- Born: Barbara H. Herstein; March 1, 1945 (age 81); Chicago, Illinois
- Children: 2

Academic background
- Education: University of Chicago

Academic work
- Discipline: History
- Sub-discipline: Medieval history
- Institutions: Loyola University Chicago

Barbara H. Rosenwein, née Herstein (born March 1, 1945) is an American historian who is professor emerita of history at Loyola University Chicago. Rosenwein is a medieval historian.

== Early life and education ==
Barbara H. Rosenwein was born in Chicago, Illinois, on March 1, 1945. She received her B.A. (1966), M.A. (1968) and Ph.D. (1974) at the University of Chicago.

== Career ==
Since 1971, Rosenwein has been closely affiliated with Loyola University Chicago, where she was instructor (1971–1974), assistant professor (1974–1980), associate professor (1980–1988), and professor (1988–2014). She retired from teaching as professor emerita in 2015, but continues to write and research.

Rosenwein has been visiting professor at many leading universities, including the École des Hautes Etudes en Sciences Sociales (Paris, 1992), École normale supérieure (Paris, 2004), Utrecht University (2005), the University of Gothenburg (2014), TU Dresden (2015), Trinity College, Oxford (2015), and the University of Iceland (2016). She was a scholar in residence at the American Academy in Rome from 2001 to 2002, was elected fellow of the John Simon Guggenheim Memorial Foundation in 1991 and the Medieval Academy of America in 2003, and been affiliated with the Centre for the History of the Emotions at Queen Mary University of London since 2009. Rosenwein has contributed to Encyclopædia Britannica.

== Research ==
Rosenwein specializes in medieval history and the history of emotions. Her scholarship may be divided into several phases. Her earliest research centered on the Abbey of Cluny, on which she wrote To Be the Neighbor of Saint Peter: The Social Meaning of Cluny's Property (1989). She then proceeded to examine immunities (privileges given to monasteries to protect them from the encroachment of laypeople or the jurisdiction of bishops in the Middle Ages), resulting in Negotiating Space: Power, Restraint, and Privileges of Immunity in Early Medieval Europe (1999). In the third phase, Rosenwein examined the history of emotions, editing Anger's Past: The Social Uses of an Emotion in the Middle Ages (1998), and writing Emotional Communities in the Early Middle Ages (2006) and Generations of Feeling: A History of Emotions 600-1700 (2016). The latter work has since been translated into Italian. In later years, Rosenwein has continued her research in medieval history and the history of emotions, co-authoring notable works such as The Middle Ages in 50 Objects (2018) and What is the History of Emotions? (2018). Among her latest works are Anger: The Conflicted History of an Emotion (2020) and "Love: A History in Five Fantasies" (2022). She is also the author of a large number of articles for scholarly publications.

Rosenwein has authored or edited several works of historiography and general history. She co-authored Debating the Middle Ages: Issues and Readings (1998), The Making of the West (2022), and is the author of A Short History of the Middle Ages (2018) and Reading the Middle Ages (2018), all of which have been published in several revised editions.

== Concepts ==
=== Emotional communities ===
Rosenwein introduced the concept of "emotional communities" to describe social groups—such as monastic houses, courts, families, or political circles—that share common norms about which emotions are valued, how they should be expressed, and how they should be interpreted. Emotional communities develop distinctive repertoires of feeling shaped by their beliefs, practices, and social relationships. Rosenwein argues that emotions are not universal psychological constants but historically situated patterns embedded in communal life. Her framework emphasizes plurality: multiple emotional communities often exist side by side, each cultivating its own affective style. Rosenwein's concept has frequently been contrasted with William M. Reddy’s notion of "emotion regimes," which refers to the normative systems through which political or institutional authorities prescribe acceptable forms of emotional expression across wide social domains. Whereas emotional communities highlight the diversity of group-specific emotional cultures, emotional regimes describe top-down structures that stabilize, enforce, or authorize particular ways of feeling in public life. Rosenwein's approach underscores horizontal variation within societies, while Reddy's focuses on overarching frameworks that may constrain or reshape the emotional possibilities available to individuals.

== Personal life ==
Rosenwein is married and has two children and five grandchildren.

== Selected works ==
- Rhinoceros Bound: Cluny in the Tenth Century (1982, University of Pennsylvania Press)
- To Be the Neighbor of St. Peter: The Social Meaning of Cluny's Property, 909-1049 (1989, Cornell University Press)
- Negotiating Space: Power, Restraint, and Privileges of Immunity in Early Medieval Europe (1999, Cornell University Press)
- A Short History of the Middle Ages (2001, Broadview Press) (fifth edition, 2018)
- Emotional Communities in the Early Middle Ages (2006, Cornell University Press)
- Generations of Feeling: A History of Emotions, 600-1700 (2015, Cambridge University Press)
- What Is the History of Emotions? (Co-authored with Riccardo Cristiani) (2017, Polity Press)
- The Middle Ages in 50 Objects (Co-authored with Elina Gertsman) (2018, Cambridge University Press)
- Anger: The Conflicted History of an Emotion (2020, Yale University Press)
- Love: A History in Five Fantasies (2022, Polity Press)

== Sources ==
- Plamper, Jan (May 12, 2010). "The History of Emotions: An Interview With William Reddy, Barbara Rosenwein, and Peter Stearns". History and Theory. 49 (2). Wiley-Blackwell: 237–265. doi:10.1111/j.1468-2303.2010.00541.x.
- "Barbara H. Rosenwein". Contemporary Authors. Gale. December 21, 2017.
- "Barbara Herstein Rosenwein". Directory of American Scholars. Gale. 2002.
