= Tarleton Gillespie =

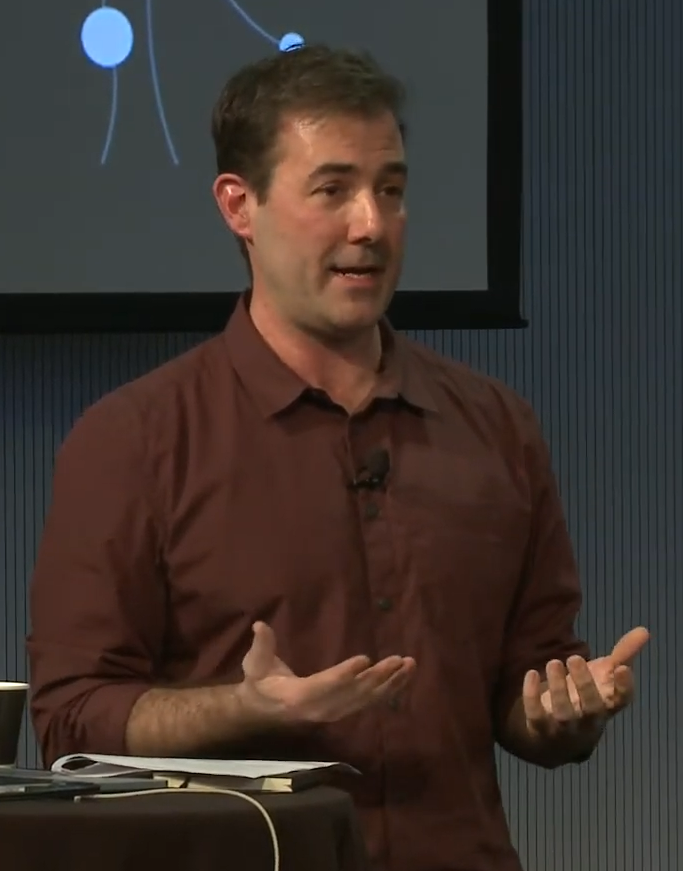
- Gillespie in 2018
- Born: January 25, 1973 (age 53); Ithaca, New York, U.S.
- Occupations: Principal Researcher, Microsoft Research New England.
- Website: www.tarletongillespie.org/

Tarleton Gillespie is a Principal Researcher at Microsoft Research New England and an Adjunct Associate Professor in the Department of Communication at Cornell University. He is the author of the book Wired Shut: Copyright and the Shape of Digital Culture.

== Education ==
Gillespie received his B.A. in English from Amherst College in 1994, and his M.A. in communication from the University of California, San Diego in 1997. He obtained his Ph.D. in communication from the University of California, San Diego in January 2002. He has been working for the Department of Communication at Cornell University since 2010.

== Research ==
Gillespie is currently researching the impact of the Internet and modern media technologies on copyright law and the progression of copyright law in the digital age. He is also interested in topics such as digital rights management and other digital copy protection strategies and their effect on culture. Broader interests include debates on peer-to-peer file-sharing, information technology, animation and children's media. His 2018 book Custodians of the Internet discusses the complex relationship social media sites have with hate speech and extremist groups on their sites, as there are no defined "custodian" responsibilities in policing this content, and actions taken are mainly left up to the discretion of private companies.

== Publications ==
- Gillespie, Tarleton. Wired Shut: Copyright and the Shape of Digital Culture (MIT Press, 2007).
- Gillespie, Tarleton. Custodians of the Internet (Yale University Press, 2018).
