= Appadurai =

Surname list

Appadurai is the surname of the following people

== Surname ==
- Arjun Appadurai (born in 1949), Indian-American anthropologist
- M. Appadurai (born in 1949), Indian politician

== Middle name ==
- Subbier Appadurai Ayer (1898–1980), Indian minister

== Given name ==
- Appadurai Muttulingam, Sri Lankan author and essayist
