= Zizi Papacharissi =

Greek-American communications researcher

- Born: Thessaloniki, Greece
- Education: Mount Holyoke College (BA); Kent State (MA); University of Texas-Austin (PhD)
- Occupation: Communication studies

Zizi Papacharissi is a Greek-American social scientist and professor. She is a UIC Distinguished Professor and Head of the Department of Communication at the University of Illinois Chicago. She also serves as the editor-in-chief of the journal Social Media + Society.

== Early life and education ==
Papacharissi was born and raised in Thessaloniki and graduated from Anatolia College in 1991. She earned a double BA in Economics and Media Studies from Mount Holyoke College in 1995, an MA in Communication Studies from Kent State University in 1997, and a Ph.D. in New Media and Political Communication from the University of Texas at Austin in 2000.

== Research ==
Papacharissi's work focuses on the social and political consequences of new media technologies. She has published nine books and over 80 chapters and journal articles. She has an h-index of 50 and has garnered more than 28,000 citations according to Google Scholar.

In her book A Private Sphere (Polity 2010), she argued that digital technologies are changing the site of civic engagement to the private realm. She further develops this thesis in her book Affective Publics: Sentiment, Technology and Politics (Oxford University 2014), arguing that social movements sustained by digital media should not be defined by their political efficacy but rather by their affective intensities or how they help publics "feel their way into" an event or issue. Affective Publics won Best Book award for the Human Communication and Technology Division of the National Communication Association in 2015 and was praised by critics. Lilie Chouliaraki wrote that Affective Publics is "a significant statement in its own right about the ontology of digital communication...introduced in the field by this groundbreaking work."

Papacharissi edited several Routledge collections, A Networked Self and Birth, Life, Death: Routledge (2019), A Networked Self and Platforms, Stories, Connections: Routledge (2018), Identity, Community and Culture on Social Network Sites and Journalism and Citizenship: New Agendas (Routledge, 2009).

Papacharissi is the editor-in-chief of Social Media + Society, published by Sage. She previously served as the editor-in-chief of the Journal of Broadcasting & Electronic Media.

Papacharissi served as a consultant for Apple, Microsoft, and the Barack Obama 2012 presidential campaign. She is frequently quoted in the media, including outlets such as the New York Times, the Chicago Tribune, and the Washington Post.

== Honors ==
Papacharissi received several honors and awards in recognition of her contributions to the study of technology, politics, society, and culture.

- UIC Distinguished Professorship, University of Illinois Chicago, 2022.
- Wayne Danielson Award, University of Texas at Austin’s Moody College of Communication, 2018.
- High-Impact Scholar, Moody College of Communication, University of Texas at Austin, 2018.
- University Scholar Award, University of Illinois System, 2017.
- HCTD Outstanding Book Award, Human Communication and Technology Division (HCTD) of the National Communication Association, 2015.
- Marshall McLuhan Award, National Communication Association, 2012.

== Select publications ==
=== Books ===
- Papacharissi, Z. (2021). After Democracy. Yale University Press.
- Papacharissi, Z. (2018). (Ed.). A Networked Self: Platforms, Stories, Connections. Routledge.
- Papacharissi, Z. (2018). (Ed.). A Networked Self: Love. Routledge.
- Papacharissi, Z. (2018). (Ed.). A Networked Self: Human Augmentics, Artificial Intelligence, Sentience. Routledge.
- Papacharissi, Z. (2018). (Ed.). A Networked Self: Birth, Life, Death. Routledge.
- Boczkowski, P., Papacharissi, Z. (2018). (Eds.) Trump and the Media. MIT Press.
- Papacharissi, Z. (2014). Affective Publics: Sentiment, Technology and Politics. Oxford University Press.
- Papacharissi, Z. (2010). A Private Sphere: Democracy in a Digital Age. Cambridge: Polity Press.
- Papacharissi, Z. (2010). (Ed.). A Networked Self: Identity, Community, and Culture on Social Network Sites. New York: Routledge.
- Papacharissi, Z. (2009). (Ed.). Journalism and Citizenship: New Agendas. Taylor and Francis.

=== Peer-reviewed articles ===
- Papacharissi, Z. (2015). Affective publics and structures of storytelling: Sentiment, events, and mediality. Information, Communication & Society, 19(3), 307-324.
- Papacharissi, Z. (2015). The unbearable lightness of information and the impossible gravitas of knowledge: Big data and the makings of a digital orality. Media, Culture & Society, 37(7), 1095-1100.
- Papacharissi, Z. (2014). Toward new journalism(s): Affective news, hybridity, and liminal spaces. Journalism Studies. Published online March 2014.
- Clark, J., Couldry, N., De Kosnik, A. T., Gillespie, T., Jenkins, H., Kelty, C., ... Papacharissi, Z. (2014). Participations, Part 5: Platforms. International Journal of Communication. Retrieved from https://ijoc.org
- Papacharissi, Z., Streeter, T., & Gillespie, T. (2013). Culture digitally: Habitus of the new. Journal of Broadcasting & Electronic Media, 57(4), 596-607.
- Papacharissi, Z. (2012). Without you, I’m nothing: Performances of the self on Twitter. International Journal of Communication, 6(2012), 1989–2006.
- Papacharissi, Z., & de Fatima Oliveira, M. (2012). Affective news and networked publics: The rhythms of news storytelling on #Egypt. Journal of Communication, 62(2), 266-282.
- Papacharissi, Z. (2010). Privacy as a luxury commodity. First Monday, 15(8). Retrieved from https://firstmonday.org
- Papacharissi, Z., & de Fatima Oliveira, M. (2008). Frames on terrorism: A comparative analysis of terrorism coverage in UK and US newspapers. Harvard International Journal of Press/Politics, 13(1), 52-74.
- Papacharissi, Z., & Fernback, J. (2005). Online privacy and consumer protection: An analysis of portal privacy statements. Journal of Broadcasting & Electronic Media, 49(3), 259-281.
- Papacharissi, Z. (2005). The real/virtual dichotomy in online interaction: A meta-analysis of research on new media uses and consequences. Communication Yearbook, 29, 215-238.
- Papacharissi, Z. (2004). Democracy online: Civility, politeness, and the democratic potential of online political discussion groups. New Media & Society, 6(2), 259-284.
- Papacharissi, Z. (2002). The self online: The utility of personal home pages. Journal of Broadcasting & Electronic Media, 46(3), 346-368.
- Papacharissi, Z. (2002). The presentation of self in virtual life: Characteristics of personal home pages. Journalism & Mass Communication Quarterly, 79(3), 643-660.
- Papacharissi, Z. (2002). The virtual sphere: The internet as the public sphere. New Media & Society, 4(1), 5-23.
- Papacharissi, Z., & Rubin, A. M. (2000). Predictors of internet use. Journal of Broadcasting & Electronic Media, 44, 175-196.

=== Podcasts and interviews ===
- Democracy Paradox. (2021, January 19). After Democracy Podcast #31. Retrieved from https://democracyparadox.com/2021/01/19/after-democracy-podcast-31/
- "What if Democracy Is Not What We Are After, But the Path to Something Else?" Nathan Schneider, March 2024, https://nathanschneider.info/2024/03/what-if-democracy-is-not-what-we-are-after-but-the-path-to-something-else/
