= Historiography of the salon =

The salons of Early Modern and Revolutionary France played an integral role in the cultural and intellectual development of France. The salons were seen by contemporary writers as a cultural hub, responsible for the dissemination of good manners and sociability. It was not merely manners that the salons supposedly spread but also ideas, as the salons became a centre of intellectual as well as social exchange, playing host to many members of the Republic of Letters. Women, in contrast to other Early Modern institutions, played an important and visible role within the salons. The extent of this role is, however, heavily contested by some historians.

The role that the salons played in the process of Enlightenment, and particularly the fact that women played such an integral part in them, means that there is an abundance of historical debate surrounding them. The relationship with the state and the public sphere, the role of women, as well as their form and periodisation are all important factors in the historiography of the salon.

== Historiography of the Salons ==
The historiography of the salons is far from straightforward. The salons have been studied in depth by a mixture of feminist, Marxist, cultural, social and intellectual historians. Each of these methodologies focus on different aspects of the salons, and thus have varying analyses of the salons’ importance in terms of French history and the Enlightenment as a whole.

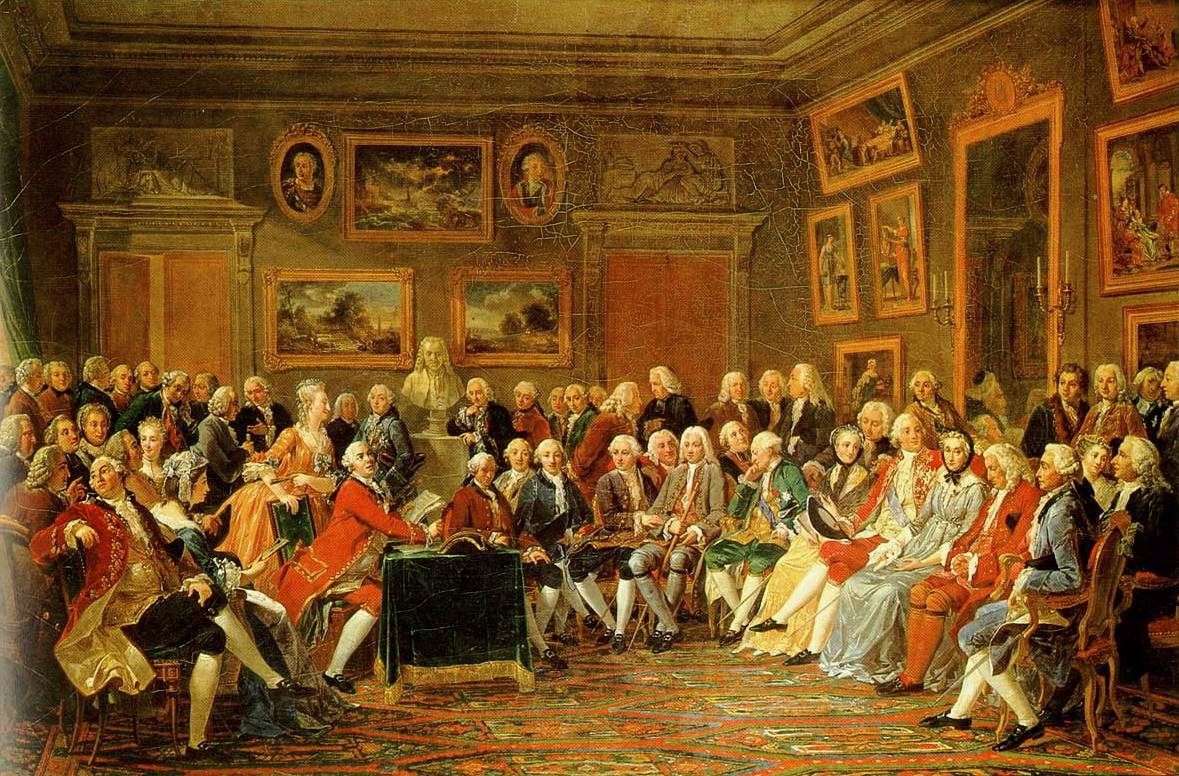
In the Salon of Madame Geoffrin in 1755 by Anicet Charles Gabriel Lemonnier.

Major historiographical debates focus around the relationship between the salons and the public sphere, as well as the role of women within the salons.

=== Periodisation of the salon ===
Breaking down the salons into a historical periods is complicated due to the various historiographical debates that surround them. Most studies stretch from the mid-seventeenth century to the end of eighteenth century. Goodman is typical in ending her study at The French Revolution, where, she writes: 'the literary public sphere was transformed into the political public'. Steven Kale is relatively alone in his recent attempts to extend the period of the salon up until Revolution of 1848. Kale points out:

A whole world of social arrangements and attitude supported the existence of french salons: an idle aristocracy, an ambitious middle class, an active intellectual life, the social density of a major urban center, sociable traditions, and a certain aristocratic feminism. This world did not disappear in 1789.

=== Conversation, content and the form of the salon ===
The content and form of the salon to some extent defines the character and historical importance of the salon. Contemporary literature about the salons is dominated by idealistic notions of politesse (politeness), civilité (civility) and honnêteté (honesty or proper behavior), but whether the salons lived up to these standards is matter of debate. Older texts on the salons tend to paint an idealistic picture of the salons, where reasoned debate takes precedence and salons are egalitarian spheres of polite conversation. Today, however, this view is rarely considered an adequate analysis of the salon. Dena Goodman claims that rather than being leisure based or 'schools of civilité' salons were instead at 'the very heart of the philosophic community' and thus integral to the process of Enlightenment. In short, Goodman argues, the seventeenth and eighteenth century saw the emergence of the academic, Enlightenment salons, which came out of the aristocratic 'schools of civilité'. Politeness, argues Goodman, took second-place to academic discussion.

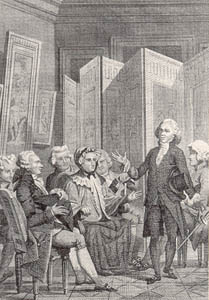
"Abbé Delille reciting his poem, La Conversation in the salon of Madame Geoffrin" from Jacques Delille, "La Conversation" (Paris, 1812)

The period in which salons were dominant has been labeled the 'age of conversation'. The topics of conversation within the salons - that is, what was and was not 'polite' to talk about - are thus vital when trying to determine the form of the salons. The salonnières were expected, ideally, to run and moderate the conversation (See Women in the salon). There is, however, no universal agreement among historians as to what was and was not appropriate conversation. Marcel Proust 'insisted that politics was scrupulously avoided'. Others suggested that little other than government was ever discussed. The disagreements that surround the content of discussion partly explain why the salon's relationship with the public sphere is so heavily contested. Oppositional politics were frowned upon within the salon, thus whether the salons can be classed as within the public sphere is debatable.

=== The salon and the 'public sphere' ===
Recent historiography of the salons has been dominated by Jürgen Habermas' work, The Structural Transformation of the Public Sphere (triggered largely by its translation into French, in 1978, and then English, in 1989), which argued that the salons were of great historical importance. Theatres of conversation and exchange – such as the salons, and the coffeehouses in England – played a critical role in the emergence of what Habermas termed the ‘public sphere’, which emerged in ‘cultural-political contrast’ to court society. Thus, while women retained a dominant role in the historiography of the salons, the salons received increasing amounts of study, much of it in direct response to, or heavily influenced by Habermas’ theory.

The dominance of Habermas’ work in salon historiography has come under criticism from some quarters, with Pekacz singling out Dena Goodman's Republic of Letters for particular criticism because it was written with ‘the explicit intention of supporting [Habermas’] thesis’, rather than verifying it. The theory itself, meanwhile, has been criticised for a fatal misunderstanding of the nature of salons. The main criticism of Habermas’ interpretation of the salons, however, is that the salons were not part of an oppositional public sphere, and were instead an extension of court society.

This criticism stems largely from Norbert Elias’ The History of Manners, in which Elias contends that the dominant concepts of the salons – politesse, civilité and honnêteté – were ‘used almost as synonyms, by which the courtly people wished to designate, in a broad or narrow sense, the quality of their own behaviour’. Joan Landes agrees, stating that, ‘to some extent, the salon was merely an extension of the institutionalised court’ and that rather than being part of the public sphere, salons were in fact in conflict with it. Erica Harth concurs, pointing to the fact that the state ‘appropriated the informal academy and not the salon’ due to the academies’ ‘tradition of dissent’ – something that lacked in the salon. But Landes’ view of the salons as a whole is independent of both Elias’ and Habermas’ school of thought, insofar that she views the salons as a ‘unique institution’, that cannot be adequately described as part of the public sphere, or court society. Others, such as Steven Kale, compromise by declaring that the public and private spheres overlapped in the salons. Antoine Lilti goes further, describing the salons as simply ‘institutions within Parisian high society,’ with little or no link to the realm of the public sphere or public opinion. Because salons appear to be largely aristocratic institutions of "politesse", Lilti argues the only possible impact on the public sphere was in the form of patronage networks for philosophes.

The most prominent defence of salons as part of the public sphere comes from Dena Goodman's The Republic of Letters, which claims that the ‘public sphere was structured by the salon, the press and other institutions of sociability’. Goodman's work is also credited with further emphasising the importance of the salon in terms of French history, the Republic of Letters and the Enlightenment as a whole, and has dominated the historiography of the salons since its publication in 1994.

=== Debates surrounding women and the salon ===
When dealing with the salons, historians have traditionally focused upon the role of women within them. Works in the nineteenth and much of the twentieth century often focused on the scandals and ‘petty intrigues’ of the salons. Other works from this period focused on the more positive aspects of women in the salon. Indeed, according to Jolanta T. Pekacz, the fact women dominated history of the salons meant that study of the salons was often left to amateurs, while men concentrated on 'more important' (and masculine) areas of the Enlightenment.

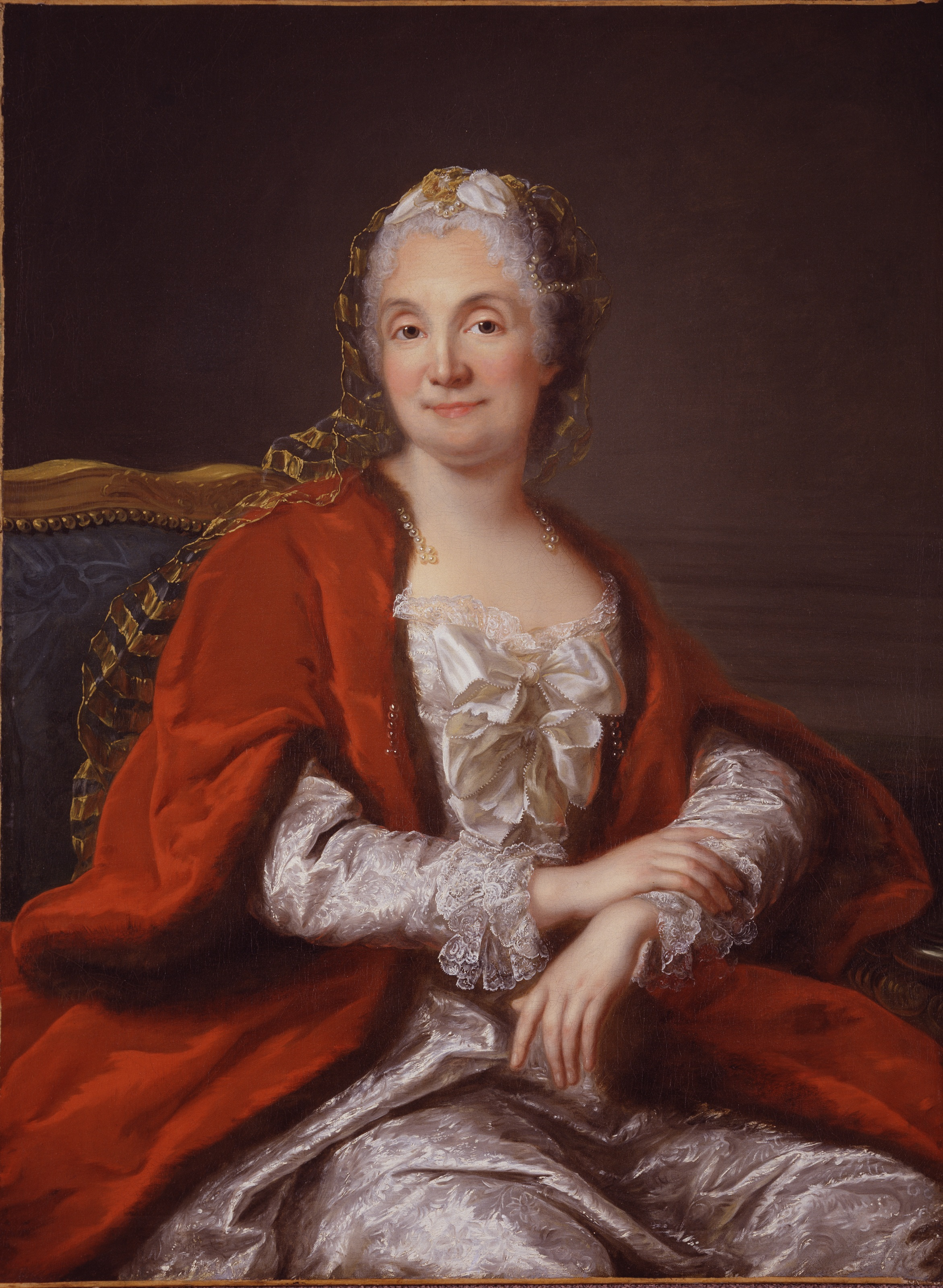
Portrait of Mme Geoffrin, salonnière, by Marianne Loir (National Museum of Women in the Arts, Washington, DC)

Historians tended to focus on individual salonnières, creating almost a 'great-woman' version of history that ran parallel to the Whiggish, male dominated history identified by Herbert Butterfield. Even in 1970, works were still being produced that concentrated only on individual stories, without analysing the effects of the salonnières' unique position. The integral role that women played within salons, as salonnières, began to receive greater - and more serious - study in latter parts of the twentieth century, with the emergence of a distinctly feminist historiography. The salons, according to Caroyln Lougee, were distinguished by 'the very visible identification of women with salons', and the fact that they played a positive public role in French society. General texts on the Enlightenment, such as Daniel Roche's France in the Enlightenment tend to agree that women were dominant within the salons, but that their influence did not extend far outside of such venues. Antoine Lilti, on the other hand, rejects the notion that women 'governed' conversation in the salons.

It was, however, Goodman's The Republic of Letters that ignited a real debate surrounding the role of women within the salons and – so Goodman contends – the Enlightenment as a whole. According to Goodman: ‘The salonnières were not social climbers but intelligent, self-educated, and educating women who adopted and implemented the values of the Enlightenment Republic of Letters and used them to reshape the salon to their own social intellectual, and educational needs’. While few historians doubt that women played an important, significant role in the salons, Goodman is often criticised for her narrow use of sources. Very recent historiography has tended to moderate Goodman's thesis, arguing that while women did play a significant role in the salons they facilitated - rather than created, as Goodman argues - the ideas and debates generally associated with the Enlightenment. This was particular true in Vienna, where the cultural salon started later than it did in Paris and Berlin.

== See also ==
- Marie Thérèse Rodet Geoffrin

== Bibliography ==
- Craveri, Benedetta, The Age of Conversation (New York: New York Review Books, 2005)
- Elias, Norbert, (Trans. Edmund Jephcott), The Civilising Process: The History of Manners, Vol. 1 (Oxford: Basil Blackwell, 1978)
- Goodman, Dena, The Republic of Letters: A Cultural History of the French Enlightenment (Ithaca: Cornell University Press, 1994)
- Goodman, Dena, 'Enlightenment Salons: The Convergence of Female and Philosophic Ambitions' Eighteenth-Century Studies, Vol. 22, No. 3, Special Issue: The French Revolution in Culture (Spring, 1989), pp. 329–350
- Kale, Steven, French Salons: High Society and Political Sociability from the Old Regime to the Revolution of 1848 (Baltimore: Johns Hopkins University Press, 2006)
- Habermas, Jürgen, (trans. Thomas Burger), The Structural Transformation of the Public Sphere: An Inquiry into a Category of Bourgeois Society (Camb., Mass.: MIT Press, 1989)
- Harth, Erica, Cartesian Women: Versions and Subversions of Rational Discourse in the Old Regime (Ithaca: Cornell University Press, 1992).
- Huddleston, Sisley, Bohemian, Literary and Social Life in Paris: Salons, Cafes, Studios (London: George G. Harrap, 1928)
- Kavanagh, Julia, Women in France during the Enlightenment Century, 2 Vols (New York: G. P. Putnam's Sons, 1893)
- Landes, Joan B., Women and the Public Sphere in the Age of the French Revolution (Ithaca: Cornell University Press, 1988);
- Latour, Anny (Trans. A. A. Dent), Uncrowned Queens: Reines Sans Couronne (London: J. M. Dent, 1970)
- Lougee, Carolyn C., Le Paradis des Femmes: Women, Salons and Social Stratification in Seventeenth Century France (Princeton: Princeton University Press, 1976)
- Lilti, Antoine, ‘Sociabilité et mondanité: Les hommes de lettres dans les salons parisiens au XVIIIe siècle’ French Historical Studies, Vol. 28, No. 3 (Summer 2005), p. 415-445
- Pekacz, Jolanta T., Conservative Tradition In Pre-Revolutionary France: Parisian Salon Women (New York: Peter Lang, 1999)
- Roche, Daniel, (Trans Arthur Goldhammr), France in the Enlightenment, (Cambridge, Mass.: HUP, 1998)
- Tallentyre, S. G., Women of the Salons (New York: G. P. Putnam's Sons, 1926)
- Webberley, Helen "Jewish cultural patronage in 1900 Vienna", Limmud Oz Conference, Melbourne, June 2011.
