= Vocabulary of emotions =

Ways of speaking that shape feelings

Vocabulary of emotions, language of emotions, emotional lexicons, and emotion talk are terms used by historians of emotions, sociologists, anthropologists, and language researchers to describe shared ways of speaking which shape how feelings are experienced, interpreted, and evaluated within a community. Evidence from these fields indicates that languages encode emotion in culturally specific ways, from unique “untranslatable” emotion words to grammar and idioms that shape feelings differently. By contrast, research on emotional expression typically focuses on nonverbal behavior treating expression as evidence of underlying emotional states, whereas the analysis of language and emotion from the historical and anthropological perspective instead focuses on how meaning is established in communication, examining how socially shared vocabularies shape what emotions are understood to be, how they are evaluated, and what responses they license, rather than on emotions as inner psychological or physiological states. (Note: For Ute Frevert, what is important about the study of a society's "vocabulary of emotions" is that "These concepts and their (unstable) meanings give us initial access to what contemporaries in a given time and place thought about emotions, what they knew about them, and how this knowledge helped them to order, distinguish, demarcate, and evaluate feelings. At the same time these concepts draw attention to the degree in which knowledge of emotions and their classification have altered over time. What was understood by affect in the eighteenth century is no longer what we understand by the term in the twenty-first century.)

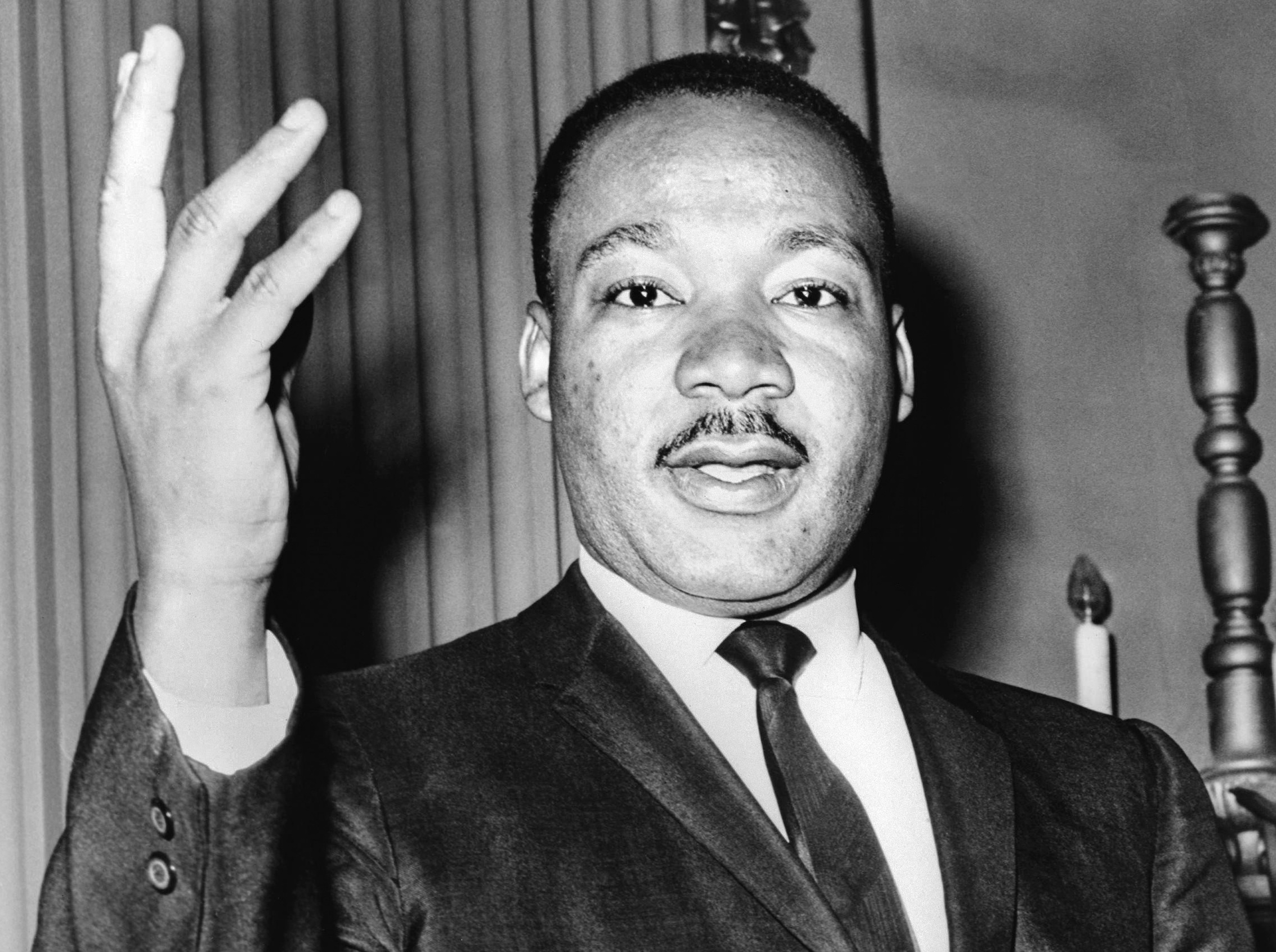
Martin Luther King heavily relied on a vocabulary of emotions in his oratory employing words such as injustice, suffering, hope, brotherhood, dignity, love, fear and patience in order to reframe anger and suffering as morally intelligible grievances, while pairing them with hope and redemptive love as legitimate public sentiments.

Emotional lexicons are socially shared vocabularies through which different societies and intellectual communities name, organize, and interpret feelings, varying not only across historical periods but also across cultural and social contexts. Their significance lies in showing that emotions are not fixed psychological universals but historically and socially contingent formations, (Note: Lang 2018, p. 105: "The idea that emotions are historically contingent is the starting point for a renewed interest in the history of emotions." This interest in the shifting nature of emotional lexicons was a response to the emotions-as-universals approach when Lang 2018, p. 108: "many historians conceived of emotions as basic physiological processes, akin to impulses and appetites. This conception of emotions as timeless human universals rendered them uninteresting to most historians.") whose meanings, moral evaluations, and practical consequences change as vocabularies of feeling shift across societies and traditions. Through these shared linguistic resources, feelings become communicable and open to agreement, dispute, or reassessment. Despite the intuitive assumption that differences in these vocabularies amount to simple shifts in wording, alternate emotion vocabularies shape which feelings are largely ignored or experienced as well as what they mean, not merely how they are described.

Research across anthropology, history, sociology, and linguistic semantics has examined how such vocabularies shape meaning and interpretation. Rather than treating an emotion solely as a private, natural, and physical event as is commonly assumed, emotional discourses are examined as social practices within diverse contexts, emphasizing how feeling is interpreted through socially available language. Differences in emotion terms across cultures and historical periods show that what counts as anger, shame, pride, or care depends in part on shared patterns of use, evaluation, and comparison. Even within a single language, groups may rely on distinctive ways of speaking about feeling that guide how experiences are made sense of.

Such research examines how emotional vocabularies operate in everyday settings and vary across social and cultural contexts, focusing on language, meaning, and shared social conventions rather than on biological processes, (Note: Reddy states “Emotion is best understood as appraisal, that is, as the grasp of a situation under one or more true descriptions, rather than as a biological process unfolding independently of interpretation.”) patterns of linguistic variation, or formal systems that regulate emotion. Emotion language is examined insofar as it contributes to the social intelligibility of feeling, (Note: Reddy emphasizes “Intentions and emotions are intelligible only within the language games through which actors make sense of what they are doing and what others are doing.”) investigating how linguistic resources make affect recognizable, interpretable, or evaluable in interaction, (Note: Reddy states “Prescribed forms of emotional expression, learned through repetition and correction, shape how situations are interpreted and what actions are taken in response.”) including through explicit emotion terms, metaphor, narrative framing, evaluative judgments, (Note: Reddy notes “Historical explanation requires attention to the narratives through which actors organized experience and rendered their intentions and emotions coherent to themselves and others.”) and other conventionalized forms of expression. Such research does not attempt a comprehensive analysis of discourse of interaction as such, but instead focuses on reconstructing the language games through which particular actions, intentions, and emotions are made intelligible. (Note: Reddy narrows the study of language used in a community stating, “The historian’s task is not to analyze interaction in its entirety, but to reconstruct the language games that rendered particular actions, intentions, and emotions intelligible.”)

== Vocabularies of emotion ==
In social interaction, feelings become intelligible through collective ways of speaking that allow experiences to be described, compared, justified, or questioned. The phrase vocabularies of emotion refers to these socially available resources for making sense of affect which encompass metaphors and evaluative cues through which feeling is characterized, the narrative forms by which emotion is conveyed as well as emotion terms and distinctions drawn between them. In this view, feelings are apprehended through shared meanings rather than treated solely as private experiences.

Scrutiny of emotion talk is itself impacted by differing emotion vocabularies which colour the view of emotion's role in understanding and judgment. In some contexts, intense or spontaneous emotion is treated as a marker of authenticity, while in others emotions are regarded as a potential source of distortion best restrained or excluded from rational thought. (Note: This meta-emotion principle is explained and illustrated by William Reddy in his book Navigation of Feeling documenting the history of emotion in 17th and 18th-century France. The revolutionaries were indoctrinating followers in the sentimentalist emotional language of the inherent goodness of the feelings, where a sentiment of anger at monarchists or patriotic zeal for the nation was “true” and authentic. On the other side were counterrevolutionaries whose court-born language of cooler sentiments and restraint was portrayed as “false,” and even dangerous. Reddy's view is that the outcome of the resulting clash of these two vocabularies during the reign of terror resulted ironically in the restoration of the current interpretative vocabulary that shame and humiliation should accompany lapses in self-control over emotional expressiveness.) The approach taken by these researchers brackets both assumptions, sidestepping popularly held views that powerful emotions are exclusively either inherently suspect or transgressively sincere.

=== Forms of emotion talk ===
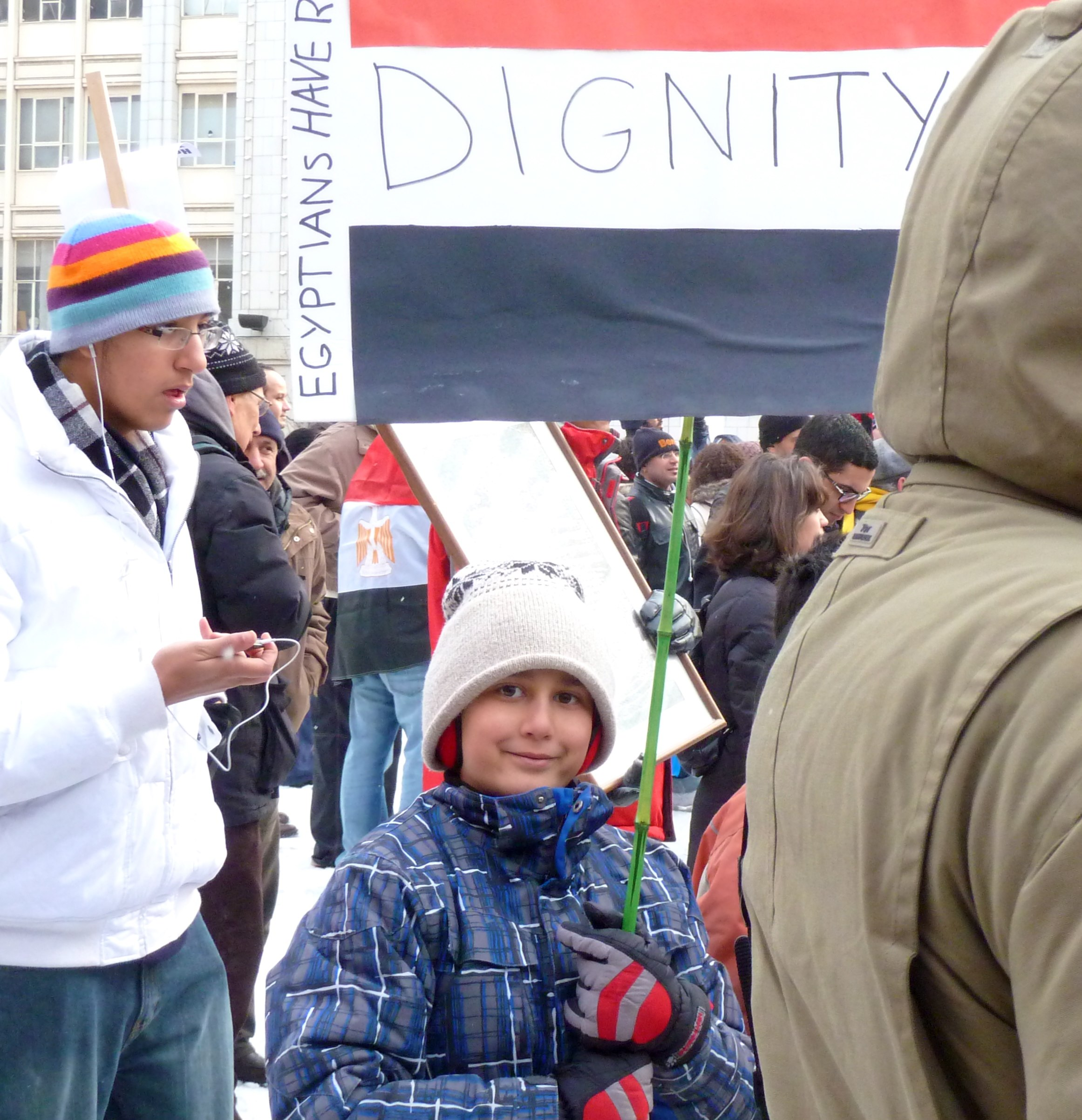
Single terms can simultaneously evoke strong feelings and social expectations. Depicted: Toronto child appearing in an Arab Spring solidarity demonstration, 2011.

Emotion talk within a vocabulary of emotion is not limited to the explicit naming of emotions. In everyday communication, feelings are rendered socially intelligible through a variety of conventional linguistic forms that differ in how directly they refer to emotion and in what they accomplish interactionally.

In some cases, speakers label emotions explicitly, as in statements such as “I feel angry” or “I’m anxious about the meeting.” Such descriptions may function as simple reports, or they may carry stronger pragmatic force depending on context. Closely related are performative statements called emotives that both name and shape feeling, such as “I am furious” or “I feel betrayed,” which can serve to test, stabilize, or recalibrate emotional orientation in relation to events or goals.

Feelings are frequently communicated indirectly without being identified. Speakers may rely on metaphorical characterizations (“castrating women”), experiential imagery (“I felt like a cat in a room of rocking chairs”), statements that feel true, or evaluative judgments that imply affect through moral assessment (“That was unfair,” “She doesn’t respect us”). In these ways, emotion is hinted at through shared narratives and emotive shorthand.

Narratives provide a common way of positioning feeling. Accounts such as “Every time I do what I’m told, someone else cuts ahead” invite listeners to infer resentment, frustration, or grievance from the structure of events rather than from stated emotion. Affect may also be signaled through interactional stance and pragmatic cues, including irony or emphasis (“Well, that’s just great”), or enacted through expletives and taboo expressions (“Fuck!”), which carry strong affective impact despite minimal semantic content.

In some settings, emotion language is used to regulate or distance feeling rather than enact it. Expressions such as “I’m noticing a lot of anger coming up” or “That sounds like grief” treat emotion as an object of reflection or management, a pattern common in therapeutic, institutional, or mediating contexts.

=== Everyday settings ===
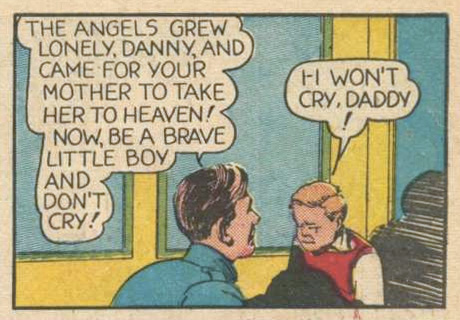
In sociology of gender studies, using emotion talk such as the saying "big boys don't cry", is a significant part of gender socialization in Western society.

In ordinary conversation, people rely on familiar words, distinctions, and narrative forms to describe what they or others are feeling. Everyday emotion words do more than name experiential states. Often they are statements about how the speaker wishes the listener to feel, (Note: The Dictionary of Media and Communication's entry for Emotive language begins with the illustration "To describe a crowd as a ‘mob’ or a ‘rabble’ is to be emotive, to convey not only information but also one’s own attitude towards the crowd and one’s intention of influencing the receiver’s attitude towards it.") using shared reference points that a community uses to help speakers and listeners make sense of situations and evaluate whether reactions appear intelligible, excessive, or troubling. It includes familiar emotion words such as anger, pride, or shame, as well as the distinctions, metaphors, and tones of judgment that accompany them. Through ordinary speech, people learn not only how to label feelings, but how to make sense of what those feelings mean in a given situation and how they are likely to be grasped by others.

Researchers in the history and anthropology of emotions have emphasized that emotion vocabularies are part of cultural practices that give feelings social intelligibility. When people describe themselves or others as feeling offended, grateful, or resentful, they draw on mutually intelligible meanings that guide interpretation of events, assign significance, and suggest socially expected responses.

These shared vocabularies also carry evaluative weight. Feeling utterances often hint rather than bluntly express judgments about whether a response is recognizable, excessive, admirable, or troubling. Studies such as those by Lila Abu-Lughod on the use of poetry and song to express complex evaluations of situations in Bedouin life demonstrate how richly and effectively competing assessments can be floated obliquely in everyday emotion talk. Such indirect communication within a vocabulary of emotion relies on a common linguistic ground through which emotions become recognizable and discussable within a community.

The concept of a vocabulary of emotion is descriptive rather than explanatory and applies to how emotion language operates in social life cueing how situations are assessed and responses are judged, often without requiring speakers to explicitly name what they are feeling. Its focus remains on meaning, interpretation, and shared understanding as they are expressed through language.

=== How vocabularies of emotion differ across cultures ===
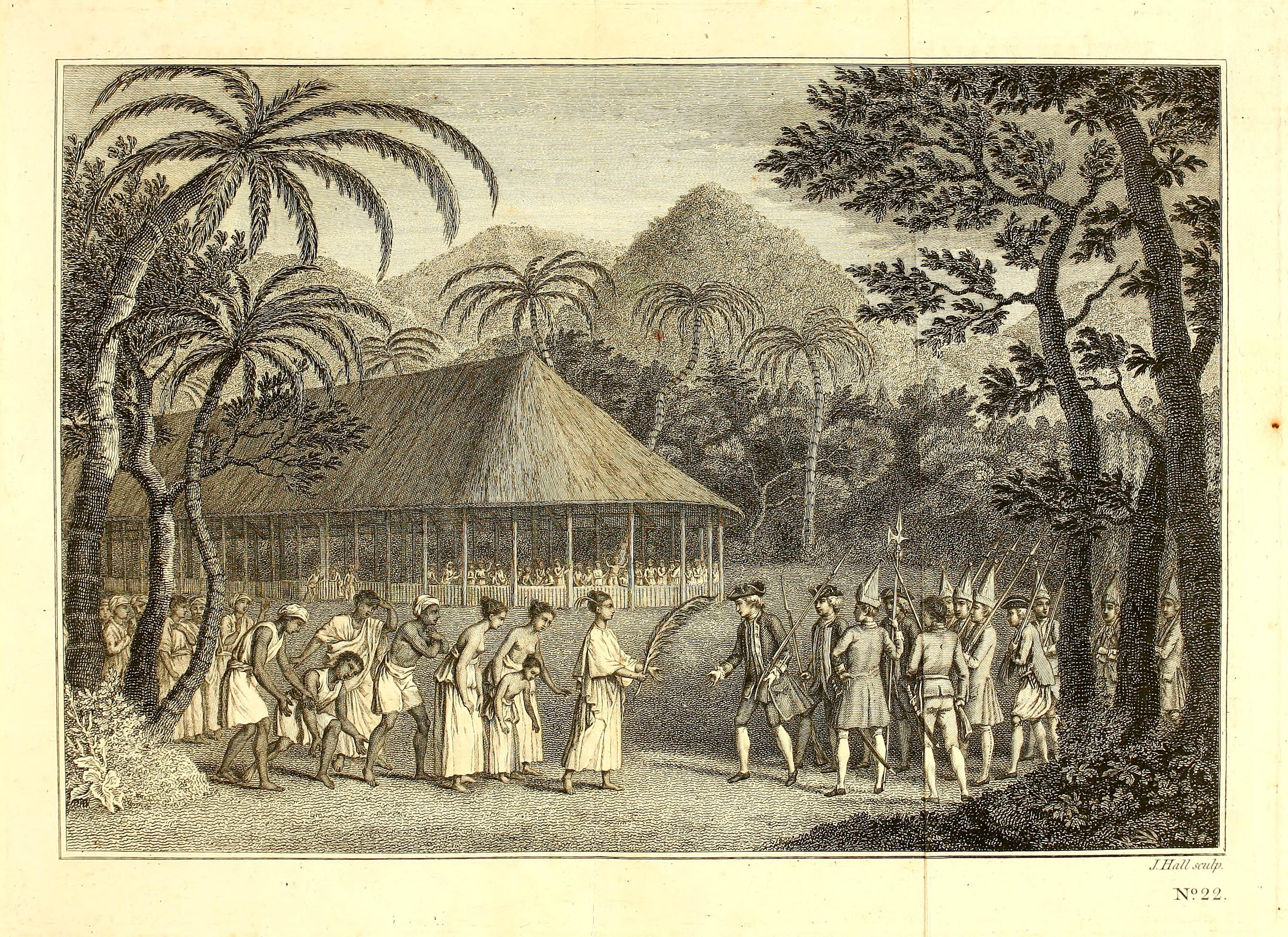
Explorer Captain Samuel Wallis met the Tahitian matriarch Purea in 1776 but due to his European emotion vocabulary mistook Tahitian interactional norms as diplomatic submission, expressions of favor to him personally, or evidence of Purea's complete authority over women.

Research in anthropology and linguistic semantics shows that languages differ markedly in how they group, separate, and evaluate feelings. (Note: Even the English concept emotion is not linguistically universal. German and Russian lack any ordinary-language equivalent but instead have a term which also applies to body senses such as "feeling an odor", while French sentiment excludes bodily sense of hunger but allows expressing how something is abstractly taken to be, such as "le sentiment d’évidence", the sense that something is self-evident. These contrasts undermine the assumption that basic emotion categories are naturally or cross-culturally given.) Some languages have multiple everyday terms where English uses one, while others lack a close equivalent for a familiar English emotion word, requiring descriptive phrases instead. These differences appear in patterns of overlap, contrast, and absence among emotion terms rather than in simple one-to-one translations.

Misrepresentation of emotion words when translated to other languages is common, with a frequently noted case being the “Two words used for love” controversy in the bible, where English translations us a single word "love" where the original greek uses two different verbs (agapaō and phileō). Discursive psychology goes further, arguing lexical differences in naming bodily and emotional states are not merely semantic; they indicate distinct cultural frameworks for construing experience, performing interpersonal work—managing blame, motive, and responsibility.

Comparative studies often map emotion vocabularies by examining how speakers judge similarity among words, the situations in which terms are used, and the typical responses they imply. Such work shows that emotion terms tend to cluster around locally salient distinctions, for example between kinds of sadness, anger, or attachment, reflecting shared ways of interpreting situations and relationships. These clusters can differ even between communities that share a national language, indicating that emotional vocabularies are shaped by everyday use rather than by grammar alone.

Ethnographic research has shown that emotion terms which appear readily translatable into English may organize feeling and evaluation in ways that are not immediately intuitive. In her study of everyday life on the Micronesian atoll of Ifaluk, Catherine Lutz discusses the term fago, which does not correspond neatly to any single English emotion word but English speakers can variously misunderstand as “love,” “sadness,” “distress,” “hunger,” or “compassion.” Each of these translations in different contexts captures part of its usage, but none corresponds closely to how the term functions in local communication.

In Ifaluk usage, fago does not name a discrete felt experience of affection, grief, or sympathy. Rather, it refers to a complex orientation toward situations involving vulnerability, dependency, or moral concern, especially where one party is perceived as weak, needy, or exposed. The term links an awareness of suffering or fragility with an expectation of appropriate response, such as care, restraint, or obligation. As a result, fago may be invoked in circumstances that do not resemble “love” or “sadness” in English terms, and it may be absent where those English labels would seem applicable.

For an English speaker, relying on familiar emotion categories can therefore be misleading. Translating fago as “compassion” may suggest a voluntary emotional stance, while translating it as “sadness” implies an inward affective state. In Ifaluk discourse, however, the term is used to evaluate situations and relationships rather than to describe subjective feeling alone. Misreading fago as a familiar emotion risks attributing personal sentiment or emotional intensity where local speakers instead recognize a shared moral and social orientation.

This example illustrates how everyday emotion language can defy intuitive expectations. Comparable patterns appear in Michelle Rosaldo’s account of the Ilongot term liget, often glossed inadequately as “anger.” Rosaldo shows that liget encompasses intensity, energy, heat, and readiness for action, and that it is closely tied to socially recognized situations such as loss, challenge, and the transition to adulthood. Through participation in rituals that name and respond to liget, individuals learn to translate feelings into particular meanings rather than as undifferentiated agitation. Experiences that fall outside this vocabulary are more likely to be treated as fleeting and unworthy of much attention as in the case of confusion, discomfort, or disorder, rather than as socially intelligible feelings. (Note: The formative role of ritual in making emotion terms intelligible at the cultural level is later treated in "Political Uses of Emotion Language" where sociologist Mabel Berezin examine how ritualized public practices sustained shared ways of speaking and feeling in Italy prior to World War II.)

=== Legal contexts ===
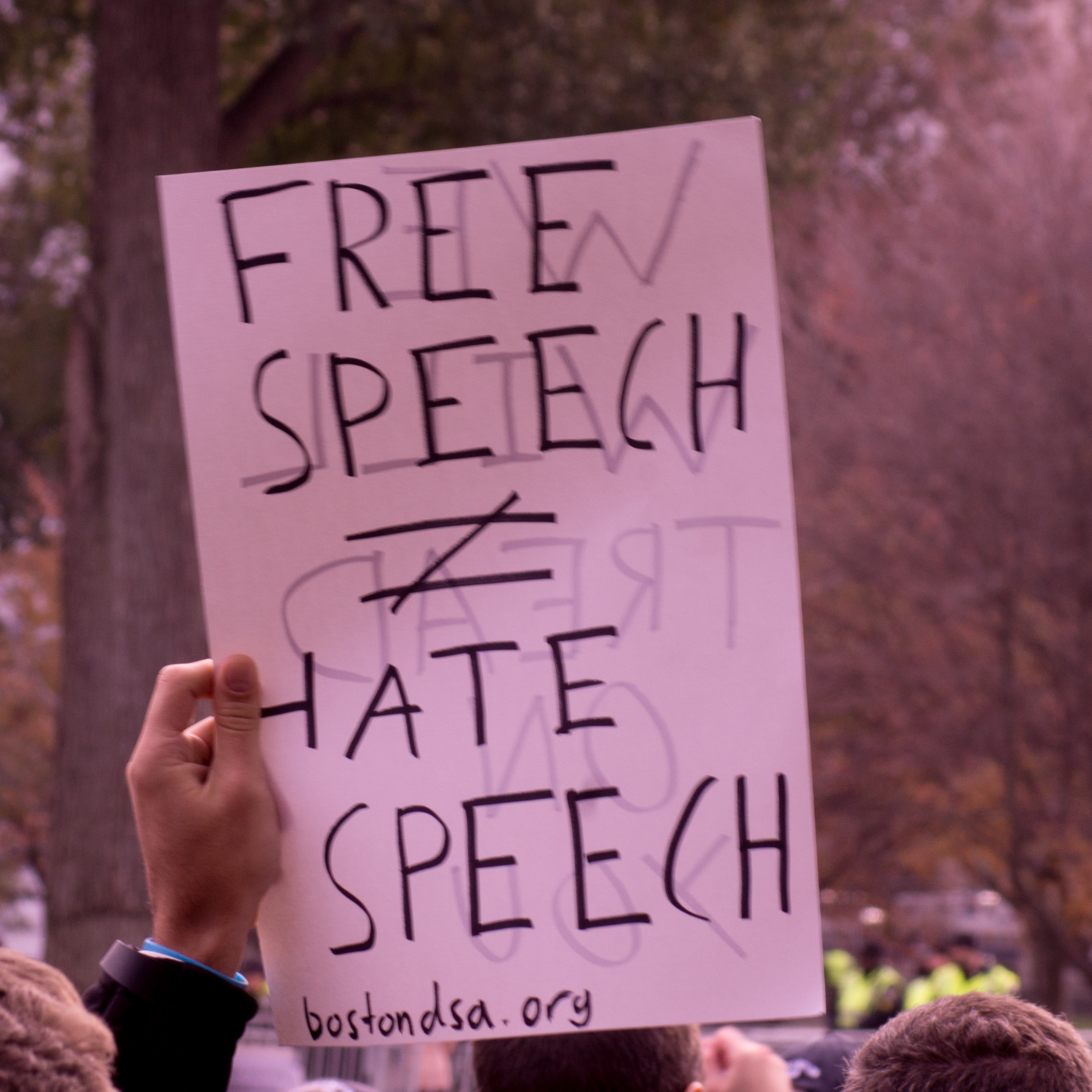
Counter protester sign at the Boston Free Speech Rally at the Boston Common on August 19, 2017.

Legal regulation of speech provides a clear example of how vocabularies of emotion operate beyond everyday interaction. Laws regulating emotion terms expressed in public, such as hatred, hostility, or contempt, vary widely across jurisdictions, reflecting different legal traditions and cultural judgments about harmful expression. Laws addressing hate speech do not attempt to assess the felt emotions or intentions directly. Instead, they rely on socially shared interpretations of what it means for language to express hostility, contempt, or hatred toward particular groups. Canadian laws regulating public use of contempt-laden emotion terms are notable for enumerating a wider range of protected groups than is common internationally, extending explicit protection beyond race and religion to include sexual orientation, gender identity or expression, disability, and age. The application of such provisions depends on how publicly expressed utterances are customarily interpreted. In this way, legal judgment implicitly draws on shared vocabularies of emotion to distinguish harmful expression from permissible speech.

== Emotion language and interpretation ==
Shared ways of talking about feelings both shape and reflect how actions, reactions, and situations are understood in everyday life. Emotion language provides interpretive frames through which people assess meaning, responsibility, and social acceptability, often without explicit discussion or formal rules; the examination of which concerns how commonly used emotion terms guide moral judgement and shared interpretation across ordinary social contexts.

=== Emotion words and moral meaning ===
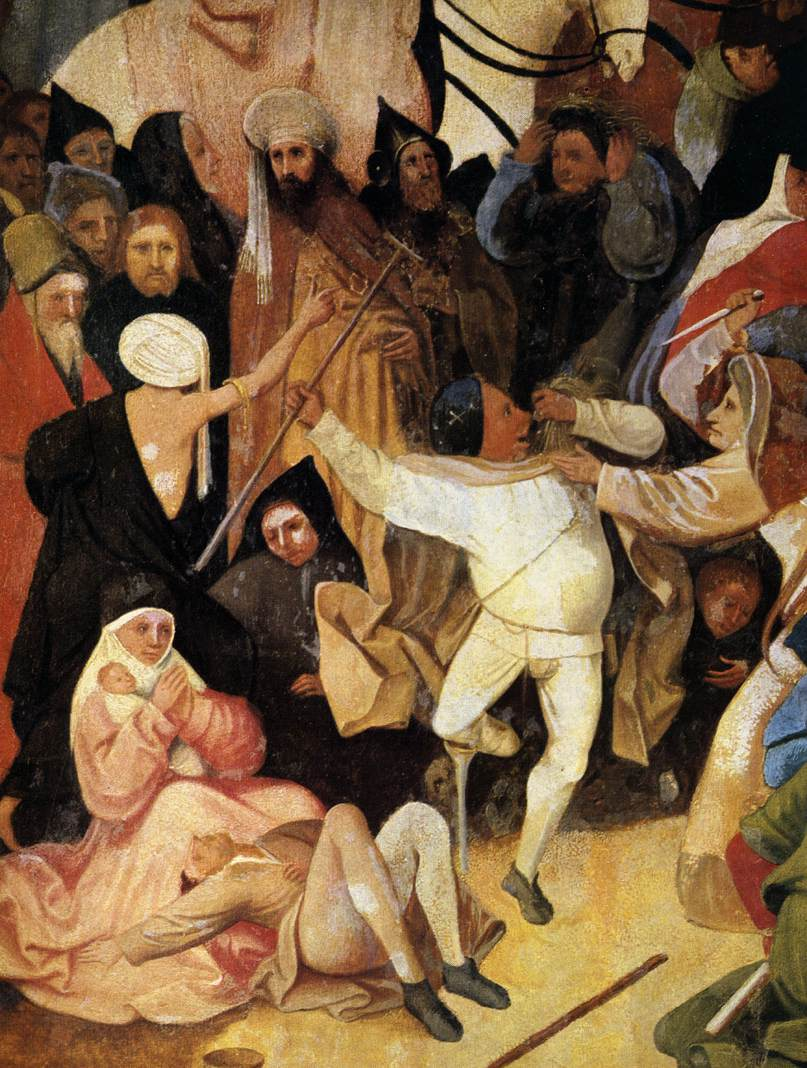
Detail from Hieronymus Bosch’s The Haywain Triptych (c. 1512–1515), depicting moralized dispositions such as greed, envy, and folly as collective social conditions. The scene reflects late-medieval frameworks of emotion that differ markedly from modern psychological understandings.

Researchers across anthropology, sociology, and the history of emotions have surfaced unique and characteristic ways that a population's emotional vocabulary establishes a structure for evaluating the social acceptability of behaviors. When someone says they acted out of anger, grief, or fear, the community's language of emotions functions as an interpretive lens that links conduct to intention, responsibility, and moral standing. In this sense, emotion language operates as part of everyday moral reasoning.

Ethnographic studies illustrate how these effects arise in ordinary interaction. In some settings, labeling an outburst as anger can present it as a response to wrongdoing, while describing the same behavior as resentment or spite may cast it as petty or illegitimate. Similarly, calling a response grief can invite sympathy and patience, whereas naming it self-pity may imply excess or moral weakness. Such distinctions do not depend on formal rules but on shared interpretations about what a given emotional utterance implies about control, intent, and proportion.

Sociologists have also noted that emotion words are often not used as descriptors of internal state, as they are used to perform tasks such as refusing to cooperate with someone, defusing a volatile situation, requesting a change in a relationship, or assigning responsibility or innocence. Describing fear can position an actor as reacting to threat rather than choosing freely, while describing anger may imply agency and accountability. Because these interpretations rely on commonly understood meanings, disagreements about which emotion best fits a situation often function as disagreements about moral evaluation itself. Emotion language thus shapes how actions are interpreted and judged, even before any appeal to formal authority or institutional response.

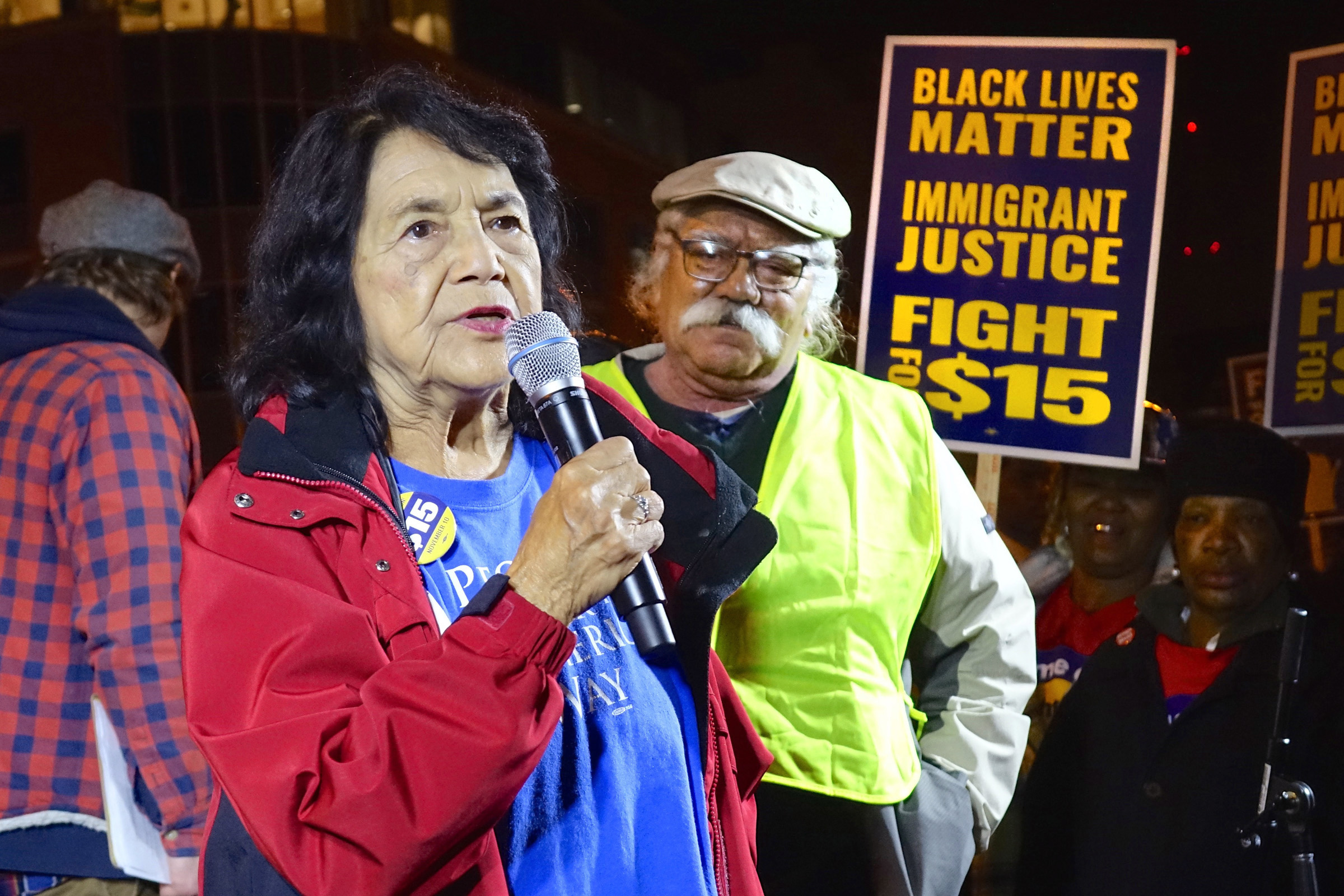
Dolores Huerta’s rhetoric condenses complex emotional orientations into portable phrases that named collective confidence and resolve. Her rich vocabulary of vigilance, pride, determination, solidarity, and hope made empowerment a shared, repeatable sentiment rather than an individual feeling.

Emotion language in Arlie Hochschild's studies frequently draws on moral categories to interpret social change. Interviewees describe anger and resentment as justified responses to perceived violations of fairness, reciprocity, and respect, often contrasting their own sense of responsibility with what they see as the irresponsibility of those regarded as cutting in line ahead of them. These terms do not simply label emotions but embed them in shared moral judgments about who deserves esteem and who does not. This shared vocabulary can fit into a narrative that Hochschild calls a “deep story” through which participants explain how the world feels to them. In this story, waiting patiently in line while others are perceived to cut ahead becomes a metaphor for unfairness, loss, and humiliation. The language of the story allows feelings of frustration and resentment to be expressed indirectly, without explicit reference to abstract concepts such as inequality or policy. As a vocabulary of emotion, the narrative supplies a shared interpretive lens establishing a collective emotional understanding across individual accounts. Hochschild also shows how emotion vocabularies help people maintain coherence amid contradictory experiences. Participants describe loving their communities while feeling betrayed by social change, or valuing hard work while believing it no longer pays off. Phrases such as “being pushed aside” or “losing ground” allow these tensions to be expressed as emotionally coherent stories rather than as conflicting feelings of pride versus their perception that they were regarded as having nothing to be proud about. Such examples demonstrate how emotional vocabularies link emotion to evaluations of belonging and legitimacy, enabling it to be coherently narratable, reinforcing the social intelligibility of feeling.

=== Emotion expectations and shared interpretations ===
Studies of emotion language show that people commonly share social conventions about what feelings make sense in particular situations, even when those expectations are never stated explicitly. These interpretations guide judgments about whether a response appears fitting, excessive, or out of place. Saying, for example, that a set of words expressing anger in a response was understandable, over the top, or cold often relies on shared meanings attached to emotion words used rather than on any formal rule. Researchers describe this as a background of tacit knowledge that allows people to interpret each other's feelings without needing explicit instruction.

Sociological accounts further emphasize that these expectations function as shared understandings rather than as formal requirements. People learn what counts as a fitting response through participation in everyday interaction, where emotion terms signal proportion, timing, and relevance. While some settings develop more explicit prescriptions about feeling, the concern here is with the ordinary, taken-for-granted meanings that make emotion language intelligible in daily life.

== Emotion language in social context ==
Emotion talk shifts across situations. The same feeling can be described, interpreted, or taken seriously in different ways depending on social roles and settings. Emotion language varies across everyday contexts, shaping which emotion claims appear credible, intelligible, or fitting in interaction, without invoking formal rules or enforcement.

=== Settings-specific emotion language ===
The ways people talk about feelings vary noticeably across social roles. In distinct emotion domains such as family settings, workplaces, in public and in multicultural settings, different vocabularies are spoken where what changes is not only which feelings are named, but how the utterances are interpreted by others.

Within families, emotion language often functions very differently than in public settings as a way of explaining behavior and negotiating obligations, often in indirect ways. Describing oneself as hurt, disappointed, or worried typically invites interpretation in relational terms, focusing attention on care, responsibility, or repair. Far from being taken simplistically as reports of private feelings, utterances with emotional content and their associated narratives are used to make sense of events and relationships, assigning meaning to actions within shared understandings of kinship and intimacy.

Feeling talk can be radically different in private conversation with close friends and in online environments where shared sentiments are likely and sanctions are unlikely. Media studies researcher Whitney Phillips describes how some participants understand their transgressive online expression as continuous with the way they speak and feel among trusted friends, explaining that they adopt a more restrained persona in mixed or offline settings while reserving a shared, emotionally candid mode of talk for interactions with those they recognize as “internet people,” who are presumed to understand and bracket such language accordingly.

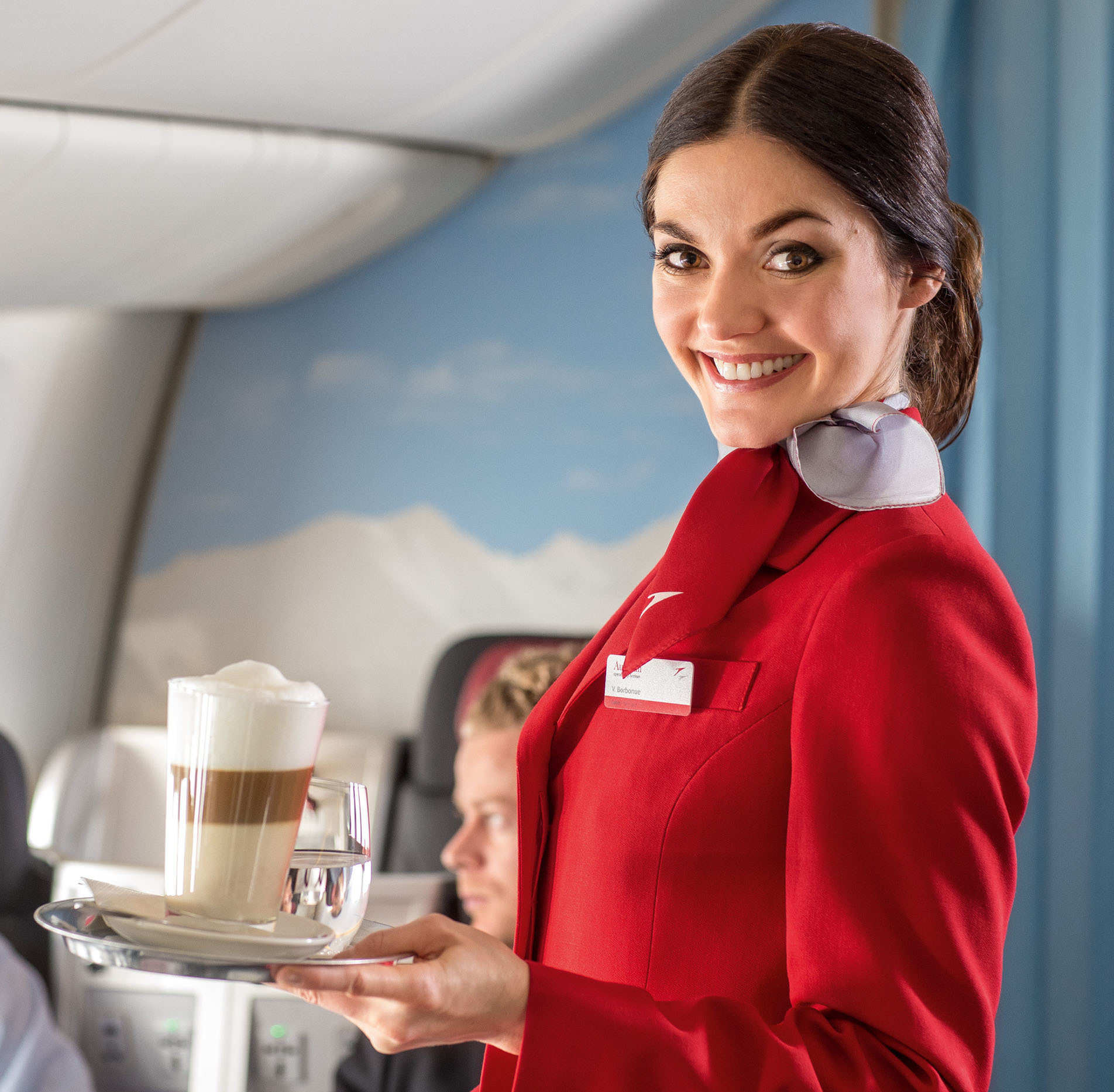
A flight attendant at work, a role requiring sustained management of emotion expression in interactions with passengers. Such occupations rely on disciplined use of emotion terms to project cheerfulness, calm, reassurance or authority under varying conditions.

In workplace contexts, emotion talk is more tightly linked to role expectations. Certain feelings are treated as relevant and credible when they align with occupational identities, while others are redirected or concealed. For example, a stewardess will use emotion words to communicate cheerful friendliness while actively defusing the anger felt towards unruly passengers using techniques similar to those of professional actors. Sociological analyses of service and professional work emphasize that emotion terms can play a crucial role for workers performing their job, especially those involved with emotional labor.

Across these contexts, emotion language does not operate uniformly. The same word can carry different implications depending on who speaks, to whom, and in what capacity. Researchers therefore emphasize that understanding emotion talk requires attention to social roles and situations, since credibility and acceptability are shaped by context rather than by the emotion term alone.

=== Public and collective emotion talk ===
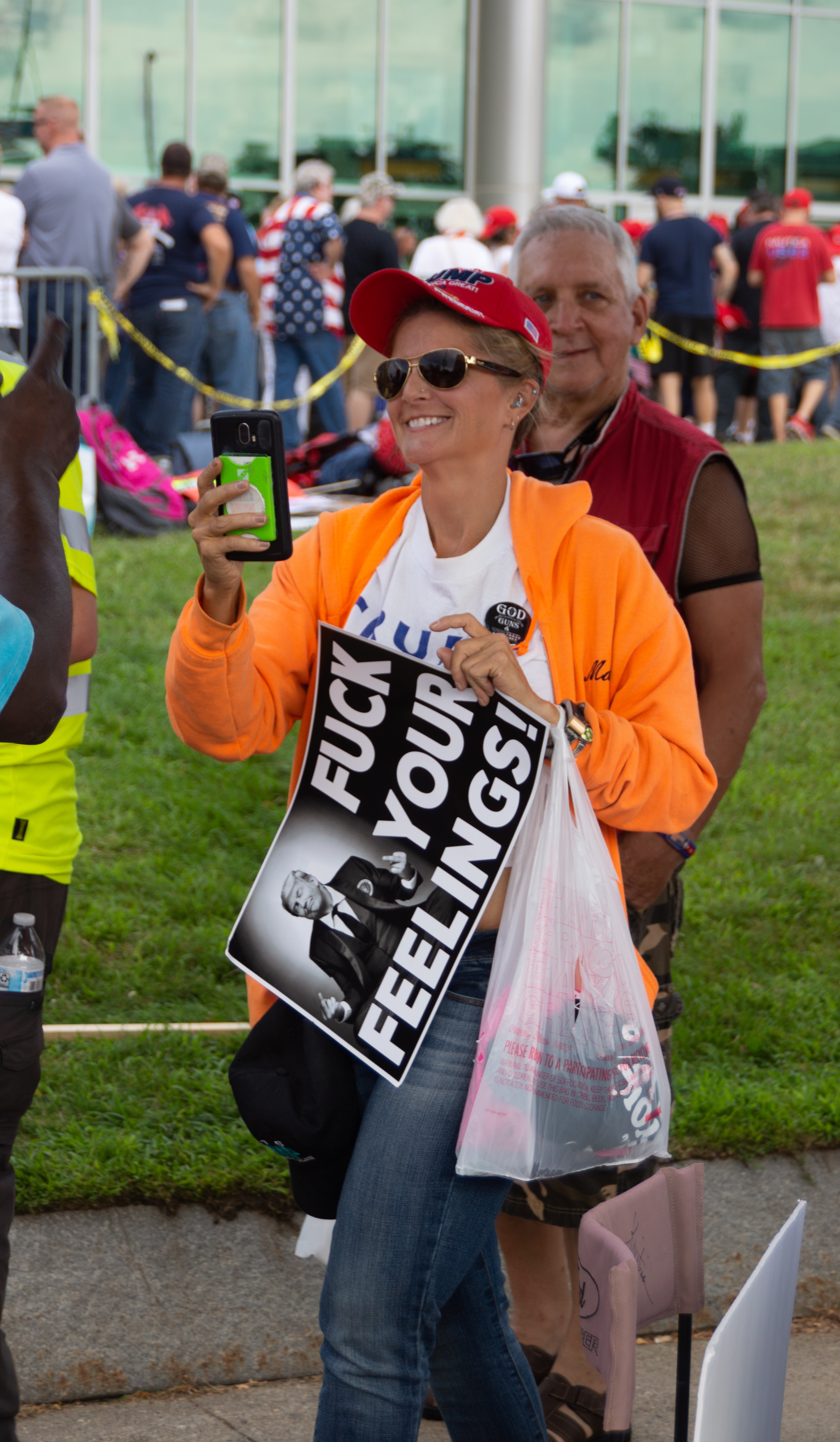
Trolling the feelings of others employs an in-group vocabulary of emotions signaling shared identity as well as establishing and reinforcing collectively held emotions.

Emotion language takes on distinctive features when it circulates in public settings. In media reporting, leadership speech, and shared narratives about events in online communities, feelings are described in a characteristic emotional vocabulary that tends to orient audiences toward a limited range of interpretations, and channel evaluations towards particular interpretations collectively held by the group.

Studies of public discourse also attend to forms of sentiment expression that operate prior to explicit political argument or policy advocacy. In many cases, recurring emotion terms circulate without clear proposals, demands, or identifiable decision-makers, yet still shape how situations are collectively understood. Descriptions centered around loss, threat, disrespect, or grievance can establish a shared sense of what is at stake without specifying who should act or how. (Note: For explanations how recurring lexical and metaphorical structures orient interpretations independently of explicit argument, see the work of George Lakoff and Mark Johnson on conceptual metaphor and framing in public discourse. In later work on embodied cognition, Lakoff argues that meaning-making is grounded in bodily experience, including sensorimotor patterns and affective responses, such that even abstract reasoning draws on low-level cognitive and emotion-related structures. This perspective helps explain why familiar emotion terms can orient understanding without formal instruction or propositional argument.)

Such expressions function less as arguments than as orienting narratives, defining events as matters of injury, decline, or moral violation and inviting audiences to inhabit those interpretations. (Note: For a classic account of how vocabularies function as “terministic screens” that invite identification and shape interpretation, see Kenneth Burke’s work on dramatism and symbolic action.) Drawing on Sara Ahmed’s account of affective circulation, emotion words, along with other signifiers such as evocative images, symbols, and narratives, accumulate affective force as they are repeatedly associated with the same figures or scenes, giving the impression of stable meanings that are in fact produced through circulation over time. Because these terms and associations are familiar and widely intelligible, they do not require formal instruction or overt persuasion to be effective. Through repetition, they contribute to the community's experienced world (Note: Following Judith Butler, Ahmed treats repetition as central to how the phenomenal world becomes stabilized and intelligible, arguing that the repeated circulation of norms and signifiers, including emotion words, gives form to what is experienced as a coherent, bounded, and self-evident social reality rather than merely reflecting a pre-given one.) in which certain distinctions, boundaries, and evaluations come to appear natural and given, narrowing the range of plausible interpretations well before any explicit political position is articulated and helping prepare the ground on which later political claims may be made, even when no immediate call to action is present.

This phenomenon has an important role in setting common objectives in a community. According to William Reddy, emotions are inseparable from goal-oriented action. Emotion language thus becomes a practical tool for navigating social life, enabling actors to monitor, recalibrate, and sometimes abandon goals in light of how situations are emotionally experienced. From Reddy's analytic perspective, leaders in public settings use emotion language not only to describe events but to steer followers’ feelings toward desired forms of action, loyalty, or sacrifice, while acknowledging that such overt efforts are always contingent and may succeed or fail. Historical analyses of public speech highlight how such emotion talk establishes and reinforces collectively held narratives, aligning listeners around common descriptions of what matters and why.

Collective narratives also sustain shared emotion language over time. Groups develop familiar ways of talking about loss, anger, or pride that shape how new events are interpreted by analogy with earlier ones. Research on emotional communities shows that these shared vocabularies help maintain continuity in interpretation, allowing members to recognize which reactions make sense within a given collective story.

One way researchers describe the collective organization of emotion language is through what literary theorist Raymond Williams called “structures of feeling,” a term which refers to shared yet loosely articulated patterns of sense-making that emerge in communication. Media studies scholar Zizi Papacharissi adapted the concept to digital environments to explain how dispersed expressions cohere into recognizable affective patterns. Papacharissi shows how hashtags support this process by sustaining an ambience of emotionally inflected storytelling that invites casual participation in the premediation which frequently preshadows news events by introducing, negotiating, and achieving dominance for evolving narratives. In the Arab Spring case, Twitter users described protests using emotion words that emphasized tension, courage, and anticipation, framing developments as moments of shared significance. These affective narrations allowed observers both within and outside Egypt to attune emotionally to the situation and follow the uprising as an unfolding drama with emotion language supplying continuity across rapidly changing circumstances.

Across these settings, public emotion language works by making some interpretations readily available while rendering others less visible. Analysts emphasize that this narrowing effect reflects shared habits of description rather than formal control or directive messaging. Emotion terms such as anger function as common reference points through which collective understanding is produced and sustained.

== Emotion language and power ==
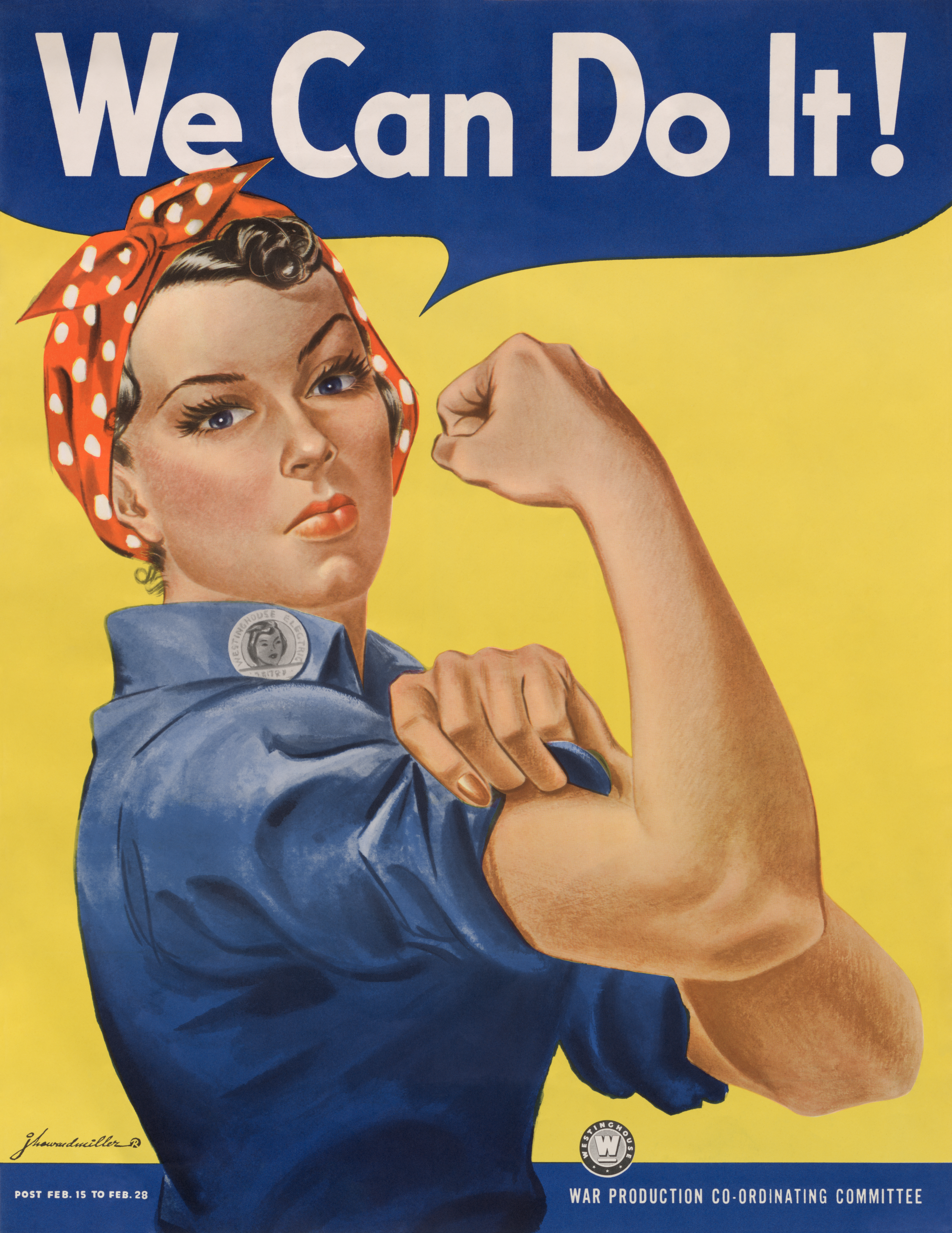
World War II workplace poster expressing the language of confidence, solidarity and pride.

Emotion language routinely expressed by the members of a community carries with it norms and expectations in line with the community's collective attitudes towards situationally warranted emotions, shaping how claims, actions, and persons are judged in public and interpersonal life. Terms such as fear, anger, resentment, or pride carry implicit evaluations that can lend credibility to some speakers while casting doubt on others. Through everyday talk, media narratives, and political rhetoric, emotional language helps establish whose reactions appear reasonable, whose seem excessive, and which interpretations of events are taken seriously. Shared ways of naming emotions influence legitimacy, authority, and persuasion, focusing on meaning and interpretation rather than formal enforcement or institutional control.

=== Emotional legitimacy ===
Shared ways of expressing feelings play a central role in determining whose reactions are treated as credible and whose are dismissed as excessive, irrational, or transgressive. Researchers have documented how these vocabularies carry evaluative meanings that position speakers morally and socially. When a reaction is described as fear rather than caution, anger rather than concern, or resentment rather than grievance, the choice of term shapes how both the feeling and the person expressing it are understood.

Anthropological studies illustrate that emotional legitimacy depends on culturally recognized forms of expression as much as on the feeling itself. In some settings, direct statements of sorrow, desire, or vulnerability may undermine a speaker's standing, while the same sentiments expressed through indirect or stylized language can be treated as acceptable and meaningful. Abu-Lughod's work shows how poetry functions as a socially intelligible register that allows certain emotions to be voiced without threatening a speaker's honor or credibility.

Emotion language expresses cultural views on the nature of knowing, legitimizing or delegitimizing statements made. In contrast to the irreducibly person-centered or relationship-centered nature of determining what is true, from the generally held Western view, emotion vocabulary does not provide the lens necessary to see the world as timeless, transcendent, and factually apprehended in a way which can provide common ground for discussion. Conversational gestures of emotion can be treated as evidence of subjective bias, while other expressions can be taken as signs of moral seriousness or sincerity. Lutz notes that Western emotion vocabularies frequently divide reactions into those viewed as reasonable responses to circumstances and those seen as personal failings, a distinction that affects how claims and complaints are received.

These evaluative effects extend beyond interpersonal encounters into public discourse. Ahmed argues that emotion terms attach value not only to feelings but to the subjects who are said to have them, influencing whether speakers appear trustworthy, dangerous, or deserving of attention. Through repeated use, such language helps establish patterned expectations about which emotions count as intelligible responses to events.

Sociological accounts similarly emphasize that shared standards of socially expected responses shape how emotion claims are interpreted. Hochschild describes how people draw on common understandings of what one ought to feel in a given situation, using these expectations to assess whether expressions appear sincere, exaggerated, or misplaced. In this way, emotion language operates as a gatekeeper of legitimacy, structuring credibility through meaning rather than through formal rules or sanctions.

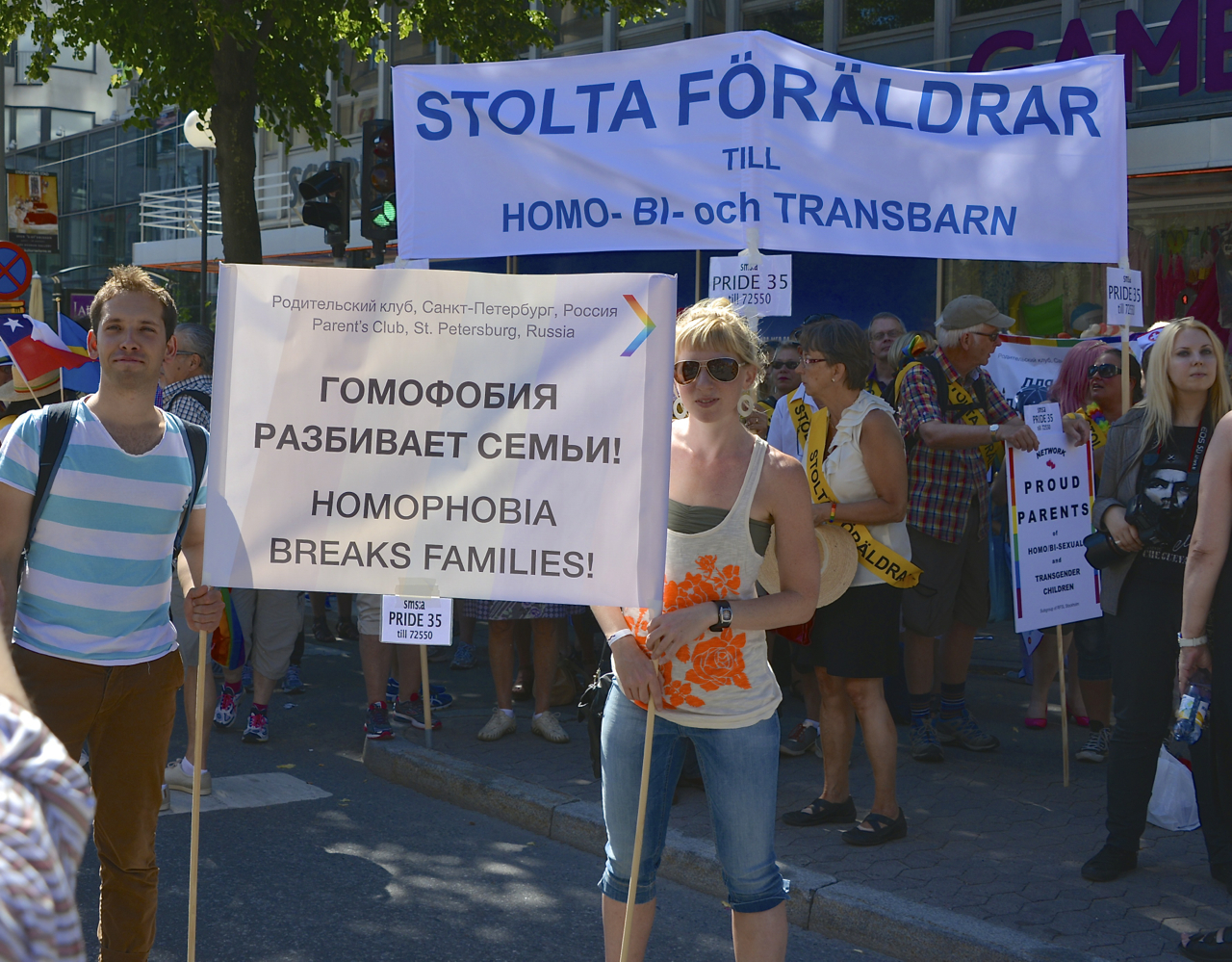
Stockholm pride parade signs. Use of terms indicating "solidarity with the family" and "legitimacy of parents feeling pride in their children" used to promote sentiments towards members of the LGBTQ+ community

Vocabularies establishing emotional legitimacy also emerge through shared practices of humor which function both as a gatekeeping device and as a tool to assert competing views on norms for judging the sincerity of expressed feelings. Phillips describes what she terms “constitutive humor,” in which collective laughter establishes an in-group while implicitly disqualifying those who do not or cannot join in. Phillips describes episodes of memorial-page trolling in which predominantly male participants mocked so-called “grief tourists,” asserting that expressions of mourning emotion language by distant strangers were insincere and illegitimate, and treating personal proximity to the deceased as a necessary condition for authentic feeling. In this contexts, discomfort, offense, or refusal to laugh are structurally primed as failures of authenticity rather than as legitimate emotional responses, marking some participants as humorless, oversensitive, or morally suspect.

Online subcultures provide especially clear examples of how shared emotion expectations are embedded in language and group identity. To illustrate with a group of online communities variously promoting masculinity, strong antifeminism, homophobia and/or misogyny, shared emotion vocabularies are organized around identity labels that simultaneously name a social position and evaluate an emotional state. Examples of these communities include the manosphere and a diverse set of groups such as the men's rights movement, incels (involuntary celibates), Men Going Their Own Way (MGTOW), pick-up artists (PUA), and fathers' rights groups. In the manosphere, there are commonly used terms such as “alpha,” “beta,” and “incel” which operate as condensed descriptors of confidence, humiliation, entitlement, or grievance. Rather than enumerating feelings explicitly, speakers rely on these labels to convey complex emotional meanings that are widely understood within each group. This particular vocabulary of emotions narrows the range of recognizable sentiments. Emotional expressions associated with sadness, uncertainty, or ambivalence tend to be linguistically displaced by categories that foreground anger, betrayal, and resentment. As a result, the available emotion terms shape how experiences are interpreted and communicated, favoring some affective meanings while rendering others difficult to articulate within the shared discourse. Such patterns illustrate how emotion expectations can be reinforced through shared vocabularies, shaping which responses are viewed are unintelligible, transgressive or legitimate within a given social setting.

=== Political uses of emotion language ===
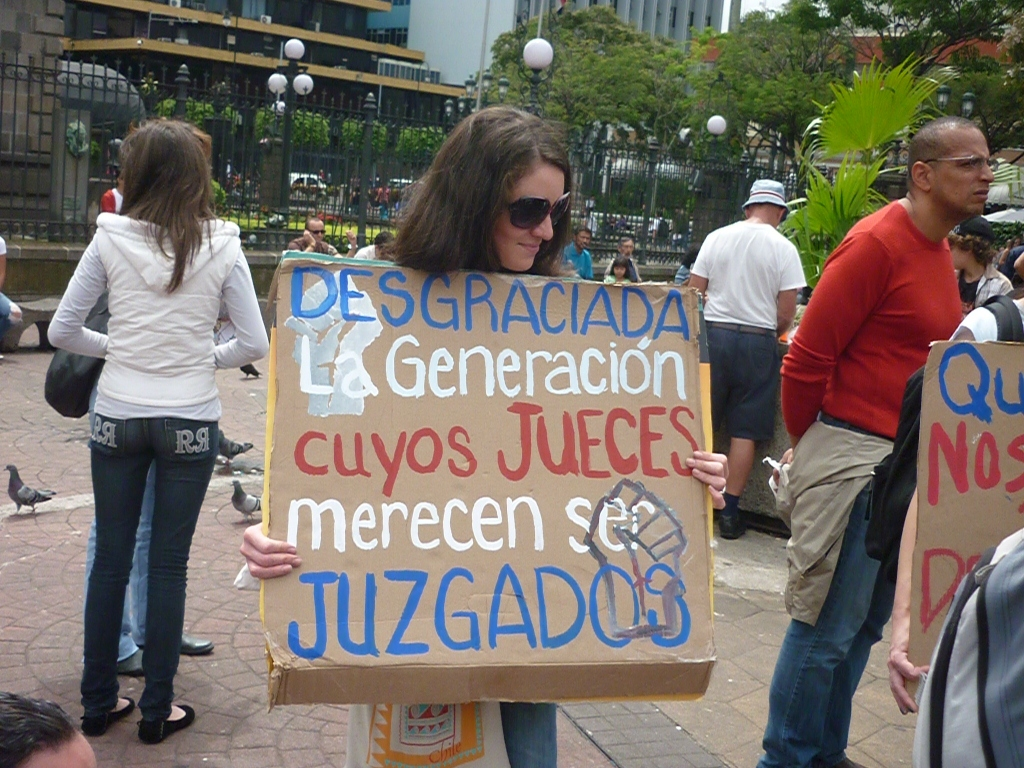
Costa Rican Indignados (indignity) movement protest sign (in English: "Woe to the generation whose judges deserve to be judged.")

Emotion vocabulary in political discourse establishes judgments about events, defines collective identities, and guides interpretation by encouraging members to replay themes with the provided language so that followers can share in the experiences of the same feelings as they use the same descriptive vocabulary. (Note: Nostitz observes, "Carlson reorganizes the affective experience of following the trial, which he suggests poses a threat to the United States’ judicial integrity and thus warrants to be regarded as a danger. Employing emotive language refers to the act of interpreting events by ascribing emotions to them. Emotive language then presents an integral tool for generating an affecting message with the capacity to elicit an emotional response in the message’s recipient (Watson and Hill 44). Carlson uses emotive language to stoke notions of (in)security, which support a framing of Chauvin’s trial that provides an interpretive context for viewers to experience fear rather than guilt, anger, and grief while following the trial.") Applied to particular events or groups, terms such as fear, outrage, resentment, pride, disgust, or solidarity gain what Sarah Ahmed calls "stickiness" to those topics through the reenactment of the feeling when a follower repeats the utterances provided. From Ahmed's analysis, understanding how rehearsed emotion language binds members to stories of justice and injustice can lead speakers to more consciously choose the performative utterances they utter.

Research on political rhetoric shows that emotion language plays a key role in mobilization. Terms associated with threat and danger can orient attention toward perceived risks and encourage defensive stances, while appeals to pride or solidarity emphasize shared identity and collective purpose. Ahmed argues that such emotion words circulate across speeches, media, and commentary, accumulating meaning through repetition and shaping how audiences come to recognize friends and adversaries. In her analysis of contemporary U.S. politics, Hochschild characterized Donald Trump as an “emotions candidate,” suggesting that his vocabulary of emotions works by affirming particular feelings, legitimating anger, resentment, and pride as appropriate responses to political circumstances, while leveraging emotional resonance as a primary mode of political connection.

Emotion language can also intensify polarization by casting disagreement in affective terms. When political claims are characterized as expressions of resentment or irrational anger, they may be dismissed as personal failings rather than engaged as substantive grievances. Lutz notes that labeling political responses as excessive or emotional often functions to delegitimize certain voices while presenting others as calm and reasonable.

Anthropological accounts further suggest that emotion talk can carry political meaning even when it appears indirect. Abu-Lughod shows how expressions of sentiment may comment on power relations and social tensions without taking the form of explicit argument, allowing political evaluations to be conveyed through culturally familiar emotional registers.

Across authoritarian movements, Hochschild claims emotion language operates as a mechanism of political orientation: vocabularies of shame frame conditions as humiliation, weakness, or moral contamination, while vocabularies of pride frame the movement as a vehicle of national renewal—mobilising followers by converting diffuse grievance into a morally charged demand for restoration. Explicitly situating David Keen’s work as an extension of this analytic focus on emotion vocabularies in politics, Hochschild notes that Keen treats shame not as a secondary or incidental feeling but as a recurring political force across diverse conflicts. In Shame: the politics and power of an emotion, Keen argues that political mobilization repeatedly turns on the circulation of shame, resistance to that shame, resentment, fear and desires for revenge—a dynamic Hochschild presents as operating across pre-Nazi Germany, Sudan, Sierra Leone, and Iraq.

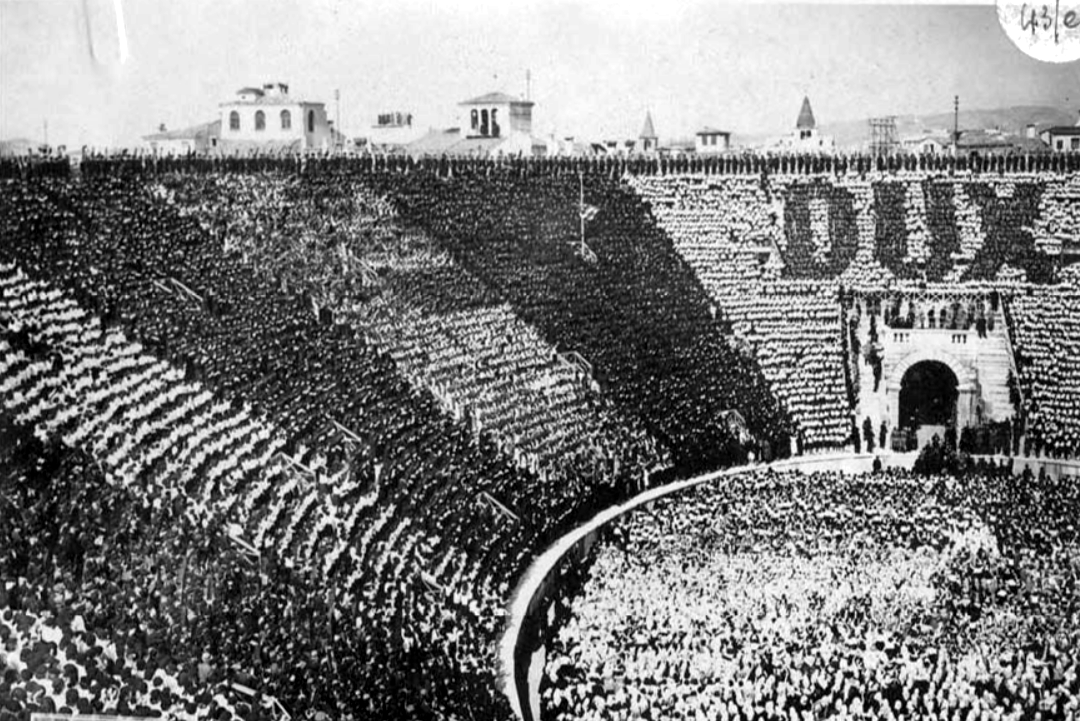
Fascist rally in Verona, 1938. Berezin describes such demonstrations as ritualized expressive events that foregrounded strong-emotion language over cognitive content, staging collective feeling as spontaneous and thereby consolidating a fascist "community of feeling."

In her analysis of Italian fascism, sociologist Mabel Berezin uses the term “communities of feeling,” drawing on Raymond Williams’ notion of structures of feeling, to describe how political movements consolidate belonging through shared affective orientations articulated and reinforced by recurring public language, symbols, and ritualized expressions, illustrating how emotion talk can operate as a mechanism of collective political identification. In interwar Italy, fascist discourse relentlessly repeated emotive narratives within public rituals held during the frequent occasions where feelings of pride, renewal, and historical destiny were amplified. Berezin describes how rallies and commemorations invoked shared terms of sacrifice and rebirth, encouraging participants to interpret their presence as an emotional contribution to the nation rather than as mere spectatorship. The emotion language used to channel feelings that otherwise might be expressed as fear was directed discursively as alert vigilance against morally constructed out-groups. Berezin shows that fascist rhetoric did not treat fear as a generalized atmosphere of anxiety but instead channeled it toward groups portrayed as ethically deficient, socially unreliable, or internally corrosive. In public narratives and ritual contexts, foreigners, political opponents, and marginalized urban populations were linguistically framed as sources of disorder whose inadequacy justified vigilance and exclusion. By naming fear as a reasonable response to moral and characterological threat, fascist discourse transformed emotional suspicion into a marker of political seriousness and belonging, illustrating how vocabularies of emotion can solidify polarized support through shared emotive interpretations rather than through explicit coercion.

These uses of emotion language shape public understanding by influencing which interpretations gain traction and which are marginalized. The focus here is on how naming feelings contributes to persuasion and division through shared meanings. Reddy's concept of emotion regimes describes how such language becomes embedded in formal systems of control or governance.

== Disciplinary perspectives and areas of disagreement ==
Research on vocabularies of emotion spans several disciplines that share an interest in how emotions are named, interpreted, and evaluated, but differ in their assumptions about what emotion language does. Anthropologists, historians, sociologists, psychologists, and linguists have each developed characteristic ways of approaching emotion talk, shaped by their methods and analytic priorities.

=== Anthropology and history of emotions ===
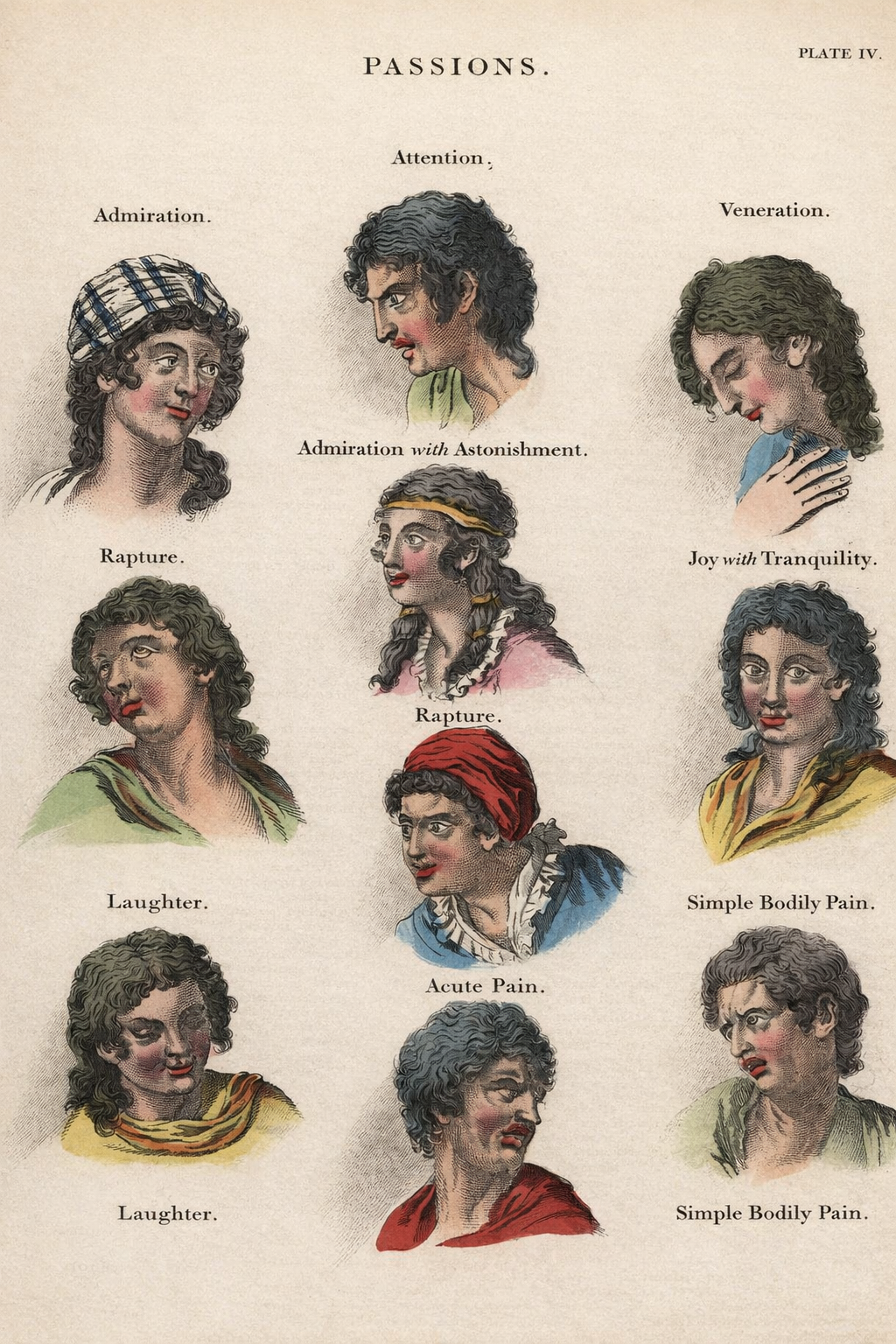
The pseudoscience physiognomy popular in the 19th century assigned a historically specific vocabulary of emotions to particular facial expressions guided by early modern moral philosophy and René Descartes' theory of emotion.

Anthropological and historical research on emotions has consistently emphasized that emotional vocabularies vary across cultures and historical periods. Progressing beyond Eurocentric views about universal inner states, researchers in these fields collected data illustrating how particular societies developed unique shared ways of naming, distinguishing, and evaluating feelings. Comparative ethnography and historical analysis have shown that what counts as anger, shame, love, or fear, and how such feelings are understood, can differ markedly across cultures and eras.

Within this perspective, emotion language is treated as shaping social experience by providing interpretive context through which events and actions are understood. Ethnographic studies describe how local emotion terms are embedded in moral expectations, ideas of personhood, and social relationships, so that describing a feeling is also a way of positioning oneself and others within a shared moral world. Analyses of Ifaluk emotion concepts, for example, illustrate that distinctions taken for granted in Western settings, such as between emotion and thought, do not necessarily organize experience elsewhere.

Historians of emotions have extended this approach to past societies, using letters, sermons, legal texts, and devotional writings to reconstruct historically specific vocabularies of emotion. In the early twentieth century, historian Johan Huizinga described the late Middle Ages as marked by an unusually direct and intense emotional language, likening its expressions of joy, sorrow, repentance, and cruelty to the immediacy of childhood. In Huizinga's account, medieval life was saturated with publicly legible forms of feeling, including tears, exuberance, and sudden emotional reversals, through which people interpreted experience and made moral and spiritual states visible to others. The work of Barbara Rosenwein also provides many illustrations, such as how modern emotion vocabularies lack a stable category for the medieval utterances of compunction, a form of being constantly punctured by sorrows that were both painful and spiritually desirable. This communicates neither despair nor guilt in the modern sense, but a valued emotional state deliberately cultivated through prayer, preaching, and meditation. In his study of shifts in the language of emotion in 18th, and 19th century France, Reddy shows how in the late ancien régime, elite social life relied on a vocabulary of politesse, sensibilité, and restrained display, in which emotional moderation signaled moral refinement and social competence. During the Revolution, this repertoire was displaced by a new vocabulary centered on sincerity, enthusiasm, and virtue, which treated emotional transparency as evidence of political commitment. As a result, individuals navigated social interaction differently: guarded civility that once enabled survival at court now appeared morally suspect, while emotional restraint could be read as counterrevolutionary duplicity possibly with fatal consequences during the Reign of Terror.

=== Sociology of emotions ===
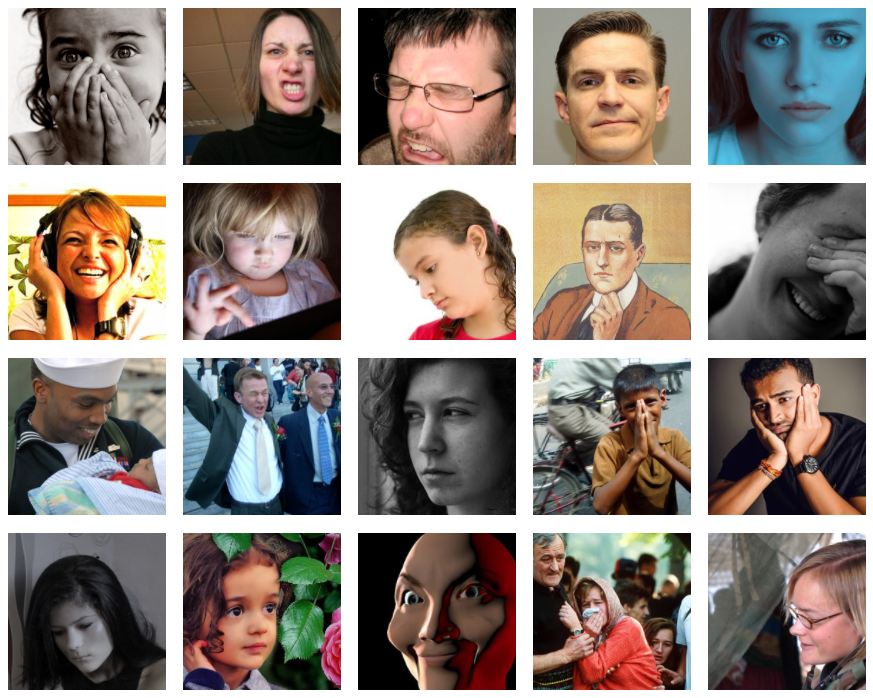
Through a sociological lens, the wide variety of emotions people feel and talk about can be seen as instigated by the social relationships that humans find themselves in.

Sociological approaches to emotions focus on how feeling is interpreted, evaluated, and made intelligible within social interaction. In this literature, emotion language is treated as normatively powerful because it provides shared terms through which people assess whether feelings are appropriate, excessive, sincere, or misplaced. Describing oneself or others as angry, grateful, or indifferent is understood as a way of invoking social expectations about how one ought to respond in a given situation.

A central theme in the sociology of emotions is that people rely on culturally available emotion terms as guides for interpreting their own experiences. Rather than accessing feelings as raw inner data, individuals use language to make sense of what they are feeling and to evaluate those feelings against shared standards. Emotion words therefore function as interpretive tools that connect personal experience to social meaning, even when the experience itself is treated as genuine and subjectively felt.

Within this field, there is variation in how strongly language is treated as constitutive of emotion. Some sociologists emphasize that emotions are socially organized patterns that include appraisal, expression, and interpretation, and that naming an emotion helps bring these elements together into a recognizable form. Others place greater weight on the role of language in organizing expectations and judgments about feelings, while allowing that affective experience may exceed or resist available vocabularies. Accounts of anger as a socially constituted syndrome, for example, highlight how rules and shared understandings shape when anger is recognized, justified, or criticized, without reducing emotion entirely to talk about it.

=== Psychology ===
Psychological approaches to emotion typically emphasize internal affective processes, such as feelings, appraisals, and bodily responses, as the primary objects of explanation. In this perspective, emotions are often treated as states that occur within individuals and that can be investigated through observation, self-report, or experimental methods. Language is commonly understood as a way of labeling or communicating these states rather than as a primary force in shaping them.

Within this framework, emotion words are frequently used as descriptive tools that allow researchers and participants to refer to subjective experience. Terms such as anger, fear, or sadness are treated as names for underlying processes that exist prior to their verbal expression, even if those processes are influenced by learning or culture. From this standpoint, differences in emotion language are often interpreted as differences in expression, awareness, or reporting, rather than as differences in the structure of experience itself.

Anthropologists and historians have described this orientation as characteristic of Western psychological discourse, noting its tendency to treat emotions as natural facts of individual subjective experience. Analyses of psychological writing on emotion point out that language in this tradition is commonly viewed as secondary to affective processes that are assumed to be more basic or universal.

In relation to emotional vocabularies, psychology therefore represents the clearest alternate emphasis among the disciplines considered here. While acknowledging that culture influences how emotions are expressed and discussed, much psychological research treats emotion language primarily as a means of describing internal states, rather than as constitutive of the shared social meanings through which emotions are recognized and interpreted.

=== Linguistics and cognitive science ===
Research in linguistics and cognitive science broadly agrees that terminology for describing feelings varies across languages. Comparative semantic studies show that languages differ in how they divide, group, and label feelings, and that apparent equivalents for terms such as anger, sadness, or fear often cover different ranges of meaning. In this line of investigation, emotion words are treated primarily as semantic categories: researchers ask how their meanings relate to other concepts within a language, how they are organized in conceptual systems, and how they can be compared across languages without assuming direct equivalence.

While such approaches focus on the structure and representation of emotion concepts, researchers explicitly studying vocabularies of emotions adopt a different perspective. Rather than asking how emotion words are defined or how they map onto internal states, it examines how people use emotion language in everyday and public contexts to interpret situations, evaluate actions, and negotiate what responses are appropriate. The emphasis is on shared understandings that operate in practice—how familiar emotion terms make conduct intelligible, justify judgments, and orient social interaction—rather than on reconstructing semantic systems or cognitive models as such. (Note: The theoretical motivations and philosophical arguments underlying these differing approaches are extensive and cannot be fully reconstructed here; the contrast between Anna Wierzbicka’s semantic project and Reddy’s theory of emotional speech acts nevertheless provides a concrete illustration of what is at stake. Neither of these researchers diverge not over the existence of cross-cultural regularities, but over what counts as a reliable analytic starting point for studying them. Wierzbicka’s Natural Semantic Metalanguage proceeds by bracketing the problem of global translation and reconstructing meanings through a restricted set of hypothesized semantic primitives, thereby treating paraphrase as achievable once analysis is confined to elementary concepts. Reddy, by contrast, takes the indeterminacy of translation identified by Quine and Davidson as a central constraint, emphasizing that emotion talk cannot be reduced to stable semantic content alone but must be analyzed as a form of situated action whose meaning emerges through use. This leads Reddy and similarly motivated researchers to focus on empirical study of emotional utterances as they are concretely employed within social, historical and political contexts, rather than on cross-linguistic equivalence at the level of semantic components.)

Comparative studies of emotion terms across cultures further illustrate this divide. Analyses of semantic clustering show that emotion categories may overlap or separate in different ways across languages, while also warning against assuming a direct correspondence between linguistic distinctions and subjective states. Such work treats emotion language as a key source of evidence for cultural variation, while remaining cautious about inferring experience solely from vocabulary.

=== Broader theoretical debates ===
Disagreements about languages of emotions reflect broader debates about the relationship between language and experience. Researchers differ in whether emotion words are understood primarily as tools for describing preexisting feelings, as resources for interpreting experience, or as elements that participate in shaping how feelings are understood and lived. These differences do not center on the existence of cultural or linguistic variation, which is widely accepted, but on how evidence from language should be used to make claims about emotional experience. Similar tensions recur across anthropology, history, psychology, and linguistics, indicating that disagreements over emotion language are part of wider discussions about meaning, interpretation, and the limits of inference rather than disputes about particular emotion terms.

== Related concepts ==
Researchers who study language and emotion distinguish vocabularies of emotion from broader conceptual frameworks that address how feelings are organized or promoted in social life. Vocabularies of emotion refer to shared ways of naming, describing, and distinguishing feelings, which allow people to make sense of their own experiences and to communicate them to others. These shared meanings shape how situations are interpreted and evaluated, but they do not in themselves prescribe behavior or establish authority over how people ought to feel.

In historical and anthropological work, Barbara Rosenwein’s notion of emotional communities highlights groups that share ways of valuing and expressing feelings, emphasizing plurality and overlap rather than uniform control. Establishing the wider context of vocabularies within a community's social norms regarding expressions of emotions, Hochschild introduced the notion of feeling rules to describe situational expectations about appropriate feelings in specific settings, such as workplaces or families, and focuses on how people learn what reactions are intelligible or credible in those contexts. These approaches intersect with vocabularies of emotion at the level of shared understanding, while differing in scope and analytic purpose.

Other authors conceptualize the boundary in other ways and vocabularies of emotion are often described as one element among several that may be involved when feelings become patterned at a wider social level. In the field of the history of emotions, academics employ Reddy's use of the term "emotives" to refer to one more narrow mode of emotion vocabularies used in performative speech acts which he argues shape emotional experience. Contrasted with Rosenwein’s notion of emotional communities where emotional alignment is maintained through belonging and shared meaning, the framework of emotion regimes established by Reddy involves some form of enforcement of penalties and other consequences, typically by official state or institutional authorities. Enforcement may be strict or loose, and could be narrowly restricted to particular institutions or events.

== Adjacent fields of research ==
How shared vocabularies of emotion shape interpretation, moral judgment, and meaning has been the focus of analysis of researchers such as Rosenwein, Lutz, Reddy, Abu-Lughod, and Hochschild. Research in the sociology of language by contrast switches the focus of analysis to examining how social structure shapes patterns of emotion talk, often treating language as a social variable shaped by power, identity, or stratification.

Other areas of research on communication of emotions center on biological theories of emotion, neural correlates, or physiological mechanisms. Research in these areas addresses different questions and uses different forms of evidence than those relevant to the study of how use of emotion language shapes meaning.

Some psychological theories, such as Lisa Barrett’s theory of constructed emotion, use the term “construction” to describe how the brain categorizes affective states using learned emotion concepts. Similar to the observations of ethnographers, from this view, emotions are "not universal, but vary from culture to culture" (see Emotions and culture). Barrett goes further by theorizing that emotions "are not triggered; you create them. They emerge as a combination of the physical properties of your body, a flexible brain that wires itself to whatever environment it develops in, and your culture and upbringing, which provide that environment." These approaches primarily address neural and cognitive mechanisms rather than the social and discursive organization of emotion language.

== See also ==
- Affective neuroscience
- Emotion regime
- Emotion work
- Emotions and culture
- Emotions and culture
- Emotive (sociology)
- Feeling rules
- History of emotions
- Linguistic relativity
- Sociology of emotions
- Sociology of language
- Structure of feeling
- Theory of constructed emotion

== Bibliography ==
=== Books ===
- Abu-Lughod, Lila (2016). Veiled Sentiments: Honor and Poetry in a Bedouin Society. Berkeley: University of California Press. ISBN 978-0-520-29249-9.
- Ahmed, Sara (2004). The Cultural Politics of Emotion. Edinburgh University Press. ISBN 978-0-7486-9113-5.
- Averill, James R. (1982). Anger and Aggression: An Essay on Emotion. New York: Springer-Verlag. ISBN 978-1-4612-5745-5.
- Barrett, Lisa (2017). "Introduction". How Emotions are Made: The Secret Life of the Brain. Houghton Mifflin Harcourt. ISBN 978-0544133310.
- Berezin, Mabel (1997). Making the Fascist Self: The Political Culture of Interwar Italy. Ithaca: Cornell University Press. ISBN 0-8014-8420-0.
- Burke, Kenneth (1969). A Rhetoric of Motives. Berkeley: University of California Press. ISBN 9780520015463.
- Frevert, Ute (2014). "Defining Emotions: Concepts and Debates over Three Centuries". In Frevert, Ute; Dixon, Thomas (eds.). Emotional Lexicons: Continuity and Change in the Vocabulary of Feeling 1700–2000. Oxford: Oxford University Press. ISBN 9780199655731.
- Heider, Karl G. (1991). Landscapes of Emotion: Mapping Three Cultures of Emotion in Indonesia. Cambridge: Cambridge University Press. ISBN 9780521032605.
- Hochschild, Arlie Russell (2012). The Managed Heart: Commercialization of Human Feeling (PDF). Berkeley: University of California Press. ISBN 978-0-520-27294-1. Archived (PDF) from the original on 2025-11-13.
- Hochschild, Arlie Russell (2016). Strangers in Their Own Land: Anger and Mourning on the American Right. New York: The New Press. ISBN 978-1-62097-225-0.
- Hochschild, Arlie Russell (2024). Stolen Pride: Loss, Shame, and the Rise of the Right. New York: The New Press. ISBN 9781620978245.
- Illouz, Eva; Gilon, Daniel; Shachak, Mattan (2014). "Emotions and Cultural Theory". In Stets, Jan E.; Turner, Jonathan H. (eds.). Handbook of the Sociology of Emotions. Dordrecht, Heidelberg, New York, London: Springer. ISBN 978-94-017-9129-8.
- Jay, Timothy (2000). Why We Curse: A Neuro-Psycho-Social Theory of Speech. Amsterdam: John Benjamins Publishing Company. ISBN 1556197586.
- Keen, David (2023). Paul, Hanna; Drake, Josh (eds.). Shame: The Politics and Power of an Emotion. Princeton, NJ: Princeton University Press. ISBN 978-0-691-18375-6.
- Lakoff, George; Johnson, Mark (1980). Metaphors We Live By. Chicago: University of Chicago Press. ISBN 9780226468013.
- Lakoff, George; Johnson, Mark (1999). Philosophy in the Flesh: The Embodied Mind and Its Challenge to Western Thought. New York: Basic Books. ISBN 9780465056743.
- Levy, Robert I. (1973). Tahitians: Mind and Experience in the Society Islands. Chicago: University of Chicago Press. ISBN 0-226-47605-7.
- Lindsey, Linda L. (2015). Gender Roles: A Sociological Perspective. London, England: Routledge. ISBN 9780205899685.
- Lutz, Catherine A. (1988). Unnatural Emotions: Everyday Sentiments on a Micronesian Atoll and Their Challenge to Western Theory. Chicago: University of Chicago Press. ISBN 0-226-49722-4.
- Lutz, Catherine A.; Abu-Lughod, Lila (1990). "Introduction: emotion, discourse, and the politics of everyday life". In Lutz, Catherine A.; Abu-Lughod, Lila (eds.). Language and the Politics of Emotion. Cambridge; Paris: Cambridge University Press; Éditions de la Maison des Sciences de l’Homme. ISBN 0-521-38868-6.
- Montagu, Jennifer (1994). The Expression of the Passions: The Origin and Influence of Charles Le Brun's Conférence sur l'expression générale et particulière. New Haven and London: Yale University Press. ISBN 0-300-05891-8.
- Papacharissi, Zizi (2015). Affective Publics: Sentiment, Technology, and Politics. New York: Oxford University Press. ISBN 978-0-19-999973-6.
- Phillips, Whitney (2015). This Is Why We Can't Have Nice Things. Cambridge, MA: MIT Press. ISBN 978-0-262-02894-3.
- Reddy, William M. (2001). The Navigation of Feeling: A Framework for the History of Emotions. Cambridge: Cambridge University Press. ISBN 978-0-521-00472-5.
- Rosaldo, Michelle Z. (1980). Knowledge and Passion: Ilongot Notions of Self and Social Life. Cambridge: Cambridge University Press. ISBN 9780521295628.
- Rosenwein, Barbara H. (2006). Emotional Communities in the Early Middle Ages. Ithaca, NY: Cornell University Press. ISBN 978-0-8014-7416-3.
- Shore, Bradd (1982). Sala'ilua, a Samoan mystery. New York and Guildford, Surrey: Columbia University Press. ISBN 0-231-05383-5.
- Watson, James; Hill, Anne (2012) [1984]. Dictionary of Media and Communication Studies (8th ed.). London and New York: Bloomsbury Academic. ISBN 978-1-84966-528-5.
- Wetherell, Margaret (2012). Affect and Emotion: A New Social Science Understanding. London: SAGE Publications Ltd. doi:10.4135/9781446250945. ISBN 978-0-85702-857-0.
- Wierzbicka, Anna (1999). Emotions across Languages and Cultures: Diversity and Universals. Cambridge: Cambridge University Press. ISBN 0-521-59971-7.

=== Journals and other sources ===
- Ging, Debbie (2019). "Alphas, Betas, and Incels: Theorizing the Masculinities of the Manosphere". Men and Masculinities. 22 (4): 638–657. doi:10.1177/1097184X17706401.

Lang, Johannes (March 2018). "New Histories of Emotion". History and Theory (Review). 57 (1). Wiley for Wesleyan University: 104–120. JSTOR 26650750.

- Nostitz, Christoph (2024). "Feeling American: Affect and Notions of (In)Security in Tucker Carlson's Coverage of Derek Chauvin's Trial". aspeers: emerging voices in american studies. 17: 43–60. doi:10.54465/aspeers.17-05.
- Nye, Robert A. (December 2003). "Review of The Navigation of Feeling: A Framework for the History of Emotions, by William M. Reddy". The Journal of Modern History. 75 (4). The University of Chicago Press: 920–923. doi:10.1086/383359. JSTOR 10.1086/383359.
- Reddy, William M. (March 2023). "To fly the plane: language games, historical narratives, and emotions". History and Theory. 62 (1). Wiley Periodicals LLC on behalf of Wesleyan University: 30–61. doi:10.1111/hith.12289. ISSN 0018-2656.
- Scheer, Monique (2012). "Are emotions a kind of practice (and is that what makes them have a history)? A Bourdieian approach to understanding emotion". History & Theory. 51 (2): 193–220. doi:10.1111/j.1468-2303.2012.00621.x.
- Urbaite, Gerda (2025). "The Linguistic Mirror of Emotion: How Language Shapes Feelings Across Cultures". Acta Globalis Humanitatis et Linguarum. 2 (5). doi:10.69760/aghel.0250050005. ISSN 3030-1718.
