= Affector =

Affector may refer to:

- a neuron that directly activates a muscle
- a thematic relation similar to agent

== See also ==
- Affecter, Attic vase painter from the 6th century BCE
- Effector (disambiguation)
- Affect (disambiguation)
