= Infection (disambiguation) =

An infection is the detrimental colonization of a host organism by a foreign species.

Infection, infected, or infectious may also refer to:

== Film and television ==
=== Film ===
- Infected (2008 film), a Canadian TV science fiction horror film
- Infected (2012 film), an American science fiction horror film
- Infected (2013 American film) or Quarantine L.A., an action horror film
- Infected (2013 British film) or The Dead Inside, a horror film
- Infection (2003 film), a Croatian film
- Infection (2004 film), a Japanese horror film
- Infection (2019 film), a Venezuelan film

=== Television ===
- "Infected" (The Last of Us), a 2023 episode
- "Infected" (Law & Order: Special Victims Unit), a 2006 episode
- "Infected" (The Practice), a 1999 episode
- "Infected" (The Walking Dead), a 2013 episode
- "Infection" (Babylon 5), a 1994 episode
- "Infection" (Chicago franchise), a 2019 crossover event
- "Infection" (Stargate Atlantis), a 2008 episode

== Music ==
- Infected (band), an Australian metal band
- The Infected, an American punk band
- Infectious Music, a British record label

=== Albums ===
- Infected (The The album) or the title song, 1986
- Infected (HammerFall album), 2011
- The Infection, by Chimaira, 2009
- Infectious, by Suburban Legends, 2007

=== Songs ===
- "Infected" (song), by Bad Religion, 1994
- "Infected", by Baboon from Ed Lobster, 1991
- "Infected", by Barthezz, 2001
- "Infected", by Demon Hunter from Demon Hunter, 2002
- "Infected", by Illidiance from Damage Theory, 2010
- "Infected", by Tiësto and Jauz, 2016
- "Infected', by Starset from Horizons, 2021
- "Infected", from the film Repo! The Genetic Opera, 2008
- "Infection", by Beartooth from Disease, 2018
- "Infection", by D'espairsRay from Coll:set, 2005
- "Infection", by Lacuna Coil from Broken Crown Halo, 2014
- "Infection", by Memphis May Fire from Shapeshifter, 2025
- "Infection", by Rx Bandits from Progress, 2001
- "The Infection", by Disturbed from Asylum, 2010
- "The Infection", by In This Moment from Black Widow, 2014
- "Infectious", by Imminence from Turn the Light On, 2019
- "Infectious", by Anthrax from Cursum Perficio, 2026

== Video games ==
- Infected (video game), a 2005 PlayStation Portable game
- Infected, a game mode in Call of Duty: Modern Warfare 3
- Infection (video game) or Ataxx, a 1990 video board game
- The Infected, a faction of infected humans in The Last of Us video game franchise

== Other uses ==
- Affection (linguistics), or infection, a type of vowel change in Celtic languages
- Infected (novel), a 2008 novel by Scott Sigler
- Infection (journal), a medical journal

== See also ==
- Affection (disambiguation)
