= Effect =

Effect may refer to:

- A result or change of something
  - List of effects
  - Cause and effect, an idiom describing causality

== Pharmacy and pharmacology ==
- Drug effect, a change resulting from the administration of a drug
  - Therapeutic effect, a beneficial change in medical condition, often caused by a drug
  - Adverse effect or side effect, an unwanted change in medical condition caused by a drug

== In media ==
- Special effect, an artificial illusion
  - Sound effect, an artificially created or enhanced sound
  - Visual effects, artificially created or enhanced images
- Audio signal processing
  - Effects unit, a device used to manipulate electronic sound
    - Effects pedal, a small device attached to an instrument to modify its sound

== Other uses ==
- Effects, one's personal property or belongings
- Effects (G.I. Joe), a fictional character in the G.I. Joe universe
- Effects (film), a 1979 film (give a wide release in 2005)
- Effect size, a measure of the strength of a relationship between two variables
- Effect system, formal system which describes the computational effects of computer programs
- Pro-Design Effect, an Austrian paraglider design manufactured by Pro-Design

== See also ==
- Affect (disambiguation)
- Effectiveness
- Efficacy
- Pragmatism, the philosophy of causes and effects
