= Affect in education =

In education, affect is broadly defined as the attitudes, emotions, and values present in an educational environment. The two main types of affect are professional affect and student affect. Professional affect refers to the emotions and values presented by the teacher which are picked up by the student, while student affect refers to the attitudes, interests, and values acquired in the educational environment. While there is the possibility of overlap between student and professional affect, the terms are rarely used interchangeably by educational professionals, with student affect being reserved primarily for use to describe developmental activities present in a school which are not presented by the teacher.

The importance of affect in education has become a topic of increasing interest in the fields of psychology and education. It is a commonly held opinion that curriculum and emotional literacy should be interwoven. Examples of such curriculum include using English language to increase emotional vocabulary (see affect labeling), and writing about the self and history to discuss emotion in major events such as genocide. This type of curriculum is also known as therapeutic education. According to Ecclestone and Hayes, therapeutic education focuses on the emotional over the intellectual.

== Educator attitudes ==
In order for such curriculum to be implemented, it is essential that educators be aware of the importance emotional literacy. Examination of educator and student attitudes towards emotional literacy is a common topic of research. Researchers have found that staff have conceptions of what constitutes emotional literacy, including being self-aware of one's own feelings, using emotional language, and being cognizant that children have feelings that need to be taken into account. In addition, staff discussed the necessity of having all educators dedicated to creating an emotionally literate school, and the detrimental effects of even one educator not supporting this initiative.

== School attitudes ==
Roffey (2008) examined the influence of emotional literacy on the school as a whole using ecological analysis. It was found that positive change was gradual, and involved multiple elements. For instance, teachers who felt as though they were genuinely valued and were consulted about policy felt happier at work. In turn, these teachers felt better prepared to handle conflicts that arose inside the classroom, and when students experienced this positive approach they were more cooperative (see cooperative learning). This shows how incorporating emotional literacy into a child's education is a school-wide collaborative effort.

== Educator experience ==
In a study of the experience of students in a teacher education program, Colmenares and Jarvie found that the "stuckness" students encountered in the process of becoming a teacher, particularly when trying to enact social justice practices, could be understood as affective. The authors critique the paradigmatic structure of learning as a concept that struggles to account for the affective aspects of both becoming a teacher and attempting to enact social justice through pedagogy.

== Funding ==
Examples of government funding of emotional literacy include Every Child Matters.

== Criticisms ==
Criticisms of emotional literacy in curriculum revolves around the idea that it although well intended, it is designed to disempower students.

== See also ==
- Affect (psychology)
