= P and R measures =

P and R measures are the statistics used to evaluate the efficiency and effectiveness of business processes, particularly automated business processes.

The P measures are the process measures – these statistics that record the number of times things occur. Examples include:

- the number of times an error loop is used
- the number of times an approval loop is used
- the average time to complete a particular task in the process

and show how efficient the process is.

The R measures are the results measures – these statistics record the 'outcomes' of the process. Examples include:

- the number of occasions when the process completed correctly
- the number of times rejections occurred
- the number of times approval was not given

and show how effective the process is.
