= Effector =

Effector may refer to:

- Effector (biology), a molecule that binds to a protein and thereby alters the activity of that protein
- Effector (album), a music album by the Experimental Techno group Download
- EFFector, a publication of the Electronic Frontier Foundation

== See also ==
- Effexor, a brand name for the antidepressant venlafaxine
- Bacterial effector protein, proteins secreted by bacterial pathogens into the cells of their host
- Effector cell
- End effector, the device at the end of a robotic arm
- Affect (disambiguation)
