= Affect =

Affect may refer to:

- Affect (education)
- Affect (linguistics), attitude or emotion that a speaker brings to an utterance
- Affect (philosophy)
- Affect (psychology), the experience of feeling or emotion
  - Affect display, signs of emotion, such as facial expression, vocalization, and posture
  - Affect theory
  - Affective science, the scientific study of emotion
  - Affective computing, an area of research in computer science aiming to understand the emotional state of users
  - Reduced affect display, a.k.a. emotional blunting or affective flattening, a reduction in emotional reactivity
  - Pseudobulbar affect, a.k.a. labile affect, the unstable display of emotion
- Affect (rhetoric), the responsive, emotional feeling that precedes cognition
- Affected accent; see Accent (sociolinguistics)
- Affect (company), a defunct Japanese video game developer

== See also ==
- Affection (disambiguation)
- Affekt, a German term used in the doctrine of the affections, a theory in the aesthetics of music
- ... (sorted)
- ... (unsorted)
- Effect (disambiguation)
