= Emotive (sociology) =

Emotives are expressive acts, realized either in words or, in earlier formulations, also in gestures, through which a speaker articulates and simultaneously alters their own felt state, functioning as a reflexive intervention in the ongoing process of translating bodily responses, attention, and interpretation into conscious experience.

== Origin ==
The term was introduced by William M. Reddy in his article, Against Constructionism: The Historical Ethnography of Emotions (1997). Reddy is a professor of History and Cultural Anthropology at Duke University.

== Description ==
Emotives describe the process by which emotions are managed and shaped, not only by society and its expectations but also by individuals themselves as they seek to express the inexpressible, namely how they "feel". Using J. L. Austin's concept of speech acts as a starting point, Reddy draws attention to what happens when a speaker's vocabulary of emotions is employed in such speech acts. Going beyond Austin's account of what an emotional expression does at a linguistic level either descriptively or performatively to produce effects in the social world, Reddy's focus is on how the utterance produces real changes in the speaker's own mental or affective state. On Reddy's account, emotion talk consists of utterances that are neither constative (descriptive) nor performative. Emotional utterances have (1) a descriptive appearance, (2) a relational intent, and (3) a self-exploring or self-altering effect. During the emotion utterance the speaker is offering a translation of something that is not observable to anyone else. The emotional language chosen stands in relation and conformance to the speaker's identity, and so has a direct impact of the actual feeling of the speaker. The context of these utterances is what Reddy calls a "halo" of (verbal and nonverbal) activated thought material. Emotion claims are attempts to translate into words (1) nonverbal events that are occurring in this halo or (2) enduring states of this halo and this background. Emotion claims, as a result, can be viewed, by analogy with speech act theory, as constituting a special class of utterance, [called emotives]. Reddy tells us in his later writing that emotives are similar to performatives in that emotives do things to the world. Emotives are themselves instruments for directly changing, building, hiding, and intensifying emotions. Ultimately, expressed emotions, i.e. emotives, may be more important than inner states of emotion in constructing a social reality (Luke 2004).

== Sincerity ==
William Reddy includes the idea of sincerity as a key point in the effects of emotive. The concept of emotives forces a redefinition of sincerity. Because of the powerful and unpredictable effects of emotional utterances on the speaker, sincerity should not be considered the natural, best, or most obvious state toward which individuals strive. On the contrary, probably the most obvious orientation toward the power of emotives is a kind of fugitive instrumentalism. One might say that, just as a performative can be happy or unhappy, an emotive brings emotional effects appropriate to its content or effects that differ markedly from its content. If it does bring up appropriate effects, then the emotive, in Western context, might be said to be "sincere"; if it does not, the emotive may be claimed, after the fact, to be hypocrisy, an evasion, a mistake, a projection, or a denial. Emotives are both self-exploring and self-altering.

== Emotive in Sociology ==
The concept of emotive is compatible with Jürgen Habermas’s critique of poststructuralists on the grounds that their theory involves them in a “performative contradiction” – because they appear to speak and write with the intention of persuading us there are no intentions. However, the concept of emotives also points toward a modification of Habermas's notion of communicative rationality, since in formulating emotives speakers are trying to communicate with themselves as much as with others. (Koury, 2004).

A related concept is emotionology, which does not refer to emotional experience, but rather the influence of social norms defining the way one ought to feel in particular situations. Reddy by contrast with the notion of emotives emphasizes how people articulate their feelings within an emotional discourse so that not only can they "know" what they feel, reflecting on their newfound knowledge, as well as enable them to feel yet more.

Finally, Rational Emotive Behavior Therapy (REBT), developed by American psychologist Albert Ellis, is solution-aimed therapy that focuses on teaching patients how to change their "irrational beliefs by verbal and behavioral counter-propagandizing activity" (Ellis). It is thought here that human beings on the basis of their belief system actively, though not always consciously, disturb themselves, and even disturb themselves about their disturbances (Rational Emotive Behavior Therapy).

== See also ==
- Emotions
- Social reality
- Poststructuralist
