= Whitney Phillips (author) =

American media studies scholar and author

Whitney Phillips is an American media studies scholar and author. She studies online misinformation.

She is assistant professor in the School of Journalism and Communication at the University of Oregon.

Phillips received a BA in philosophy from Humboldt State University in 2004, a MFA in creative writing from Emerson College in 2007, and a PhD in English from the University of Oregon.

== Books ==
- Phillips, Whitney; Brockway, Mark (2025). The Shadow Gospel: How Anti-Liberal Demonology Possessed US Religion, Media, and Politics. The MIT Press. ISBN 9780262552271.
- Phillips, Whitney; Milner, Ryan (2023). Share Better and Stress Less: A Guide to Thinking Ecologically about Social Media. Candlewick Press/MITeen. ISBN 9781536228748.
- Phillips, Whitney; Milner, Ryan (2021). You Are Here: A Field Guide for Navigating Polarized Speech, Conspiracy Theories, and Our Polluted Media Landscape. MIT Press. ISBN 9780262539913.
- Phillips, Whitney; Milner, Ryan M. (2017). The Ambivalent Internet: Mischief, Oddity, and Antagonism Online. Polity Press. ISBN 9781509501274.
- Phillips, Whitney (2015). This is Why We Can’t Have Nice Things: Mapping the Relationship between Online Trolling and Mainstream Culture. MIT Press. ISBN 9780262529877.

=== Reports ===
- Phillips, Whitney (2018). The Oxygen of Amplification: Better Practices for Reporting on Extremists, Antagonists, and Manipulators Online (Report). Data & Society.
