= Affection (disambiguation) =

Affection is often associated with a feeling or type of love.

Affection may also refer to:

== Films ==
- Affection (1972 film), a 1972 Bulgarian film
- Affections, a 2024 musical film
- Affection (2025 film), a 2025 American sci fi horror film
- Affection, a 1966 Hong Kong film

== Music ==
- Affection (Lisa Stansfield album), 1989
- Affection (Jody Watley album), 1995, or the title song
- Affection (Koda Kumi album), 2002
- "Affection", a song from the All-American Rejects' album Kids in the Street, 2012
- "Affection", a song by the Modern Lovers, as seen live on their 1978 TopPop TV Special (broadcast in 1979)
- Affectionate, a 2012 EP by Venetian Snares
- "Affection", a song from Tyga's album Starface, 2026
- "Affectionate" (song) by Kitty from Miami Garden Club, 2017

== Other uses ==
- Affection (linguistics), in Celtic linguistics, the fronting of vowels in the main syllable of a word
- Doctrine of the affections, an esthetic theory of the Baroque era

== See also ==
- Affect (disambiguation)
