= Effectiveness =

Capability of producing the desired result

Effectiveness or effectivity is the capability of producing a desired result or the ability to produce desired output. When something is deemed effective, it means it has an intended or expected outcome, or produces a deep, vivid impression.

== Etymology ==
The origin of the word effective stems from the Latin word effectīvus, which means "creative, productive, or effective". It surfaced in Middle English between 1300 and 1400 AD.

== Usage ==
=== Science and technology ===
==== Mathematics and logic ====
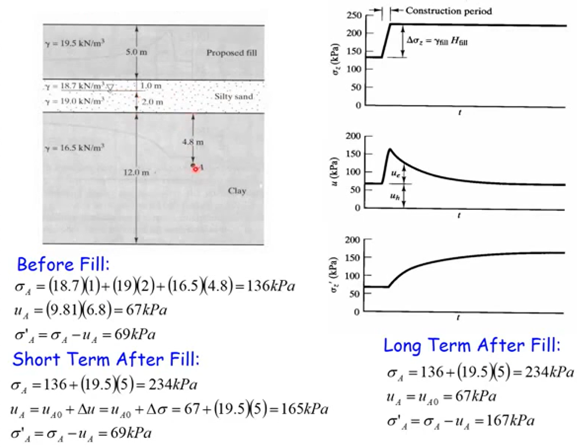
Calculation of effective stress, the theory of which is an effective theory

In mathematics and logic, effective is used to describe metalogical methods that fit the criteria of an effective procedure.

In group theory, a group element acts effectively (or faithfully) on a point if that point is not fixed by the action.

==== Physics ====
In physics, an effective theory is, similar to a phenomenological theory, a framework intended to explain certain (observed) effects without the claim that the theory correctly models the underlying (unobserved) processes.

In heat transfer, effectiveness is a measure of the performance of a heat exchanger when using the NTU method.

==== Medicine ====
In medicine, effectiveness relates to how well a treatment works in practice, especially as shown in pragmatic clinical trials, as opposed to efficacy, which measures how well it works in explanatory clinical trials or research laboratory studies.

=== Humanities and social sciences ===
In management, effectiveness relates to getting the right things done. Peter Drucker reminds his readers that "effectiveness can and must be learned". The term "institutional effectiveness" has been widely adopted within higher education settings to assess "how well an institution is achieving its mission and goals". For example, Utica University in New York State holds that "an effective institution is characterized by a clearly defined mission that articulates who it serves, what it aspires to be, and what it values. Likewise, an effective institution has clear goals that are broadly communicated to its stakeholders". Pope Francis adopts the same term in a critique of governmental effectiveness when he refers to "a number of countries [with] a relatively low level of institutional effectiveness", which leads to "greater problems for their people while benefiting those who profit from this situation". He refers, for example, to countries whose laws are "well written" but not effectively enforced.

In human–computer interaction, effectiveness is defined as "the accuracy and completeness of users' tasks while using a system".

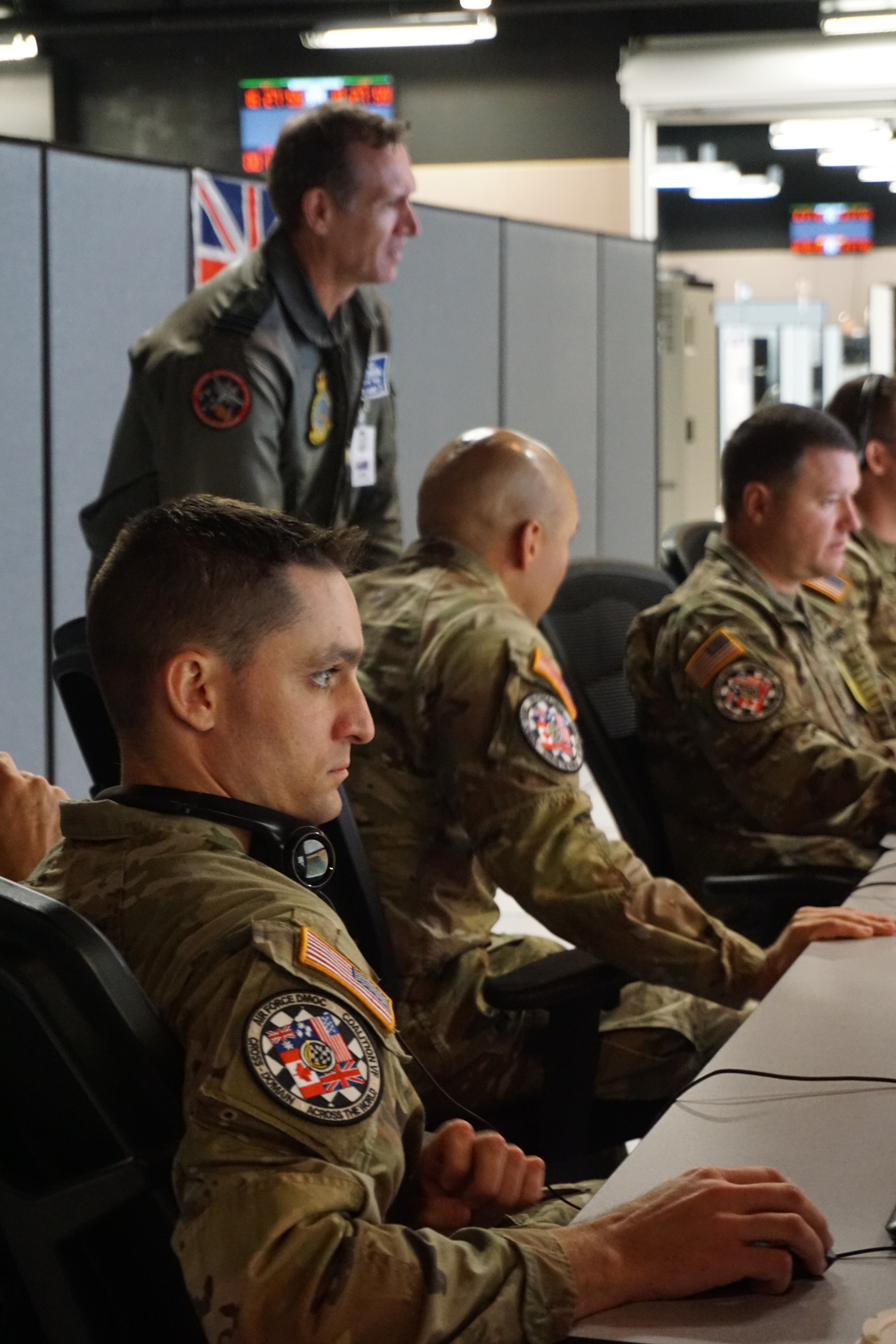
A US military exercise, designed to increase combat effectiveness

In military science, effectiveness is a criterion used to assess changes determined in the target system, in its behavior, capability, or assets, tied to the attainment of an end state, achievement of an objective, or creation of an effect, while combat effectiveness is: "...the readiness of a military unit to engage in combat based on behavioral, operational, and leadership considerations. Combat effectiveness measures the ability of a military force to accomplish its objective and is one component of overall military effectiveness."

== Related terms ==
Efficacy, efficiency, and effectivity are terms that can, in some cases, be interchangeable with the term effectiveness. The word effective is sometimes used in a quantitative way, "being very effective or not very effective". However, neither "effectiveness" nor "effectively" informs about the direction (positive or negative) or gives a comparison to a standard of the given effect. Efficacy, on the other hand, is the extent to which a desired effect is achieved; the ability to produce a desired amount of the desired effect, or the success in achieving a given goal. Contrary to efficiency, efficacy focuses on the achievement itself, not the resources spent to achieve the desired effect. Therefore, what is effective is not necessarily efficacious, and what is efficacious is not necessarily efficient.

Other synonyms for effectiveness include: clout, capability, success, weight, performance. Antonyms for effectiveness include: uselessness, ineffectiveness.

== See also ==
- Effect (disambiguation)
