= Pro-Design =

Pro-Design GmbH
- Company type: Gesellschaft mit beschränkter Haftung
- Industry: Aerospace
- Founded: 1986
- Headquarters: Innsbruck, Austria
- Products: Paragliders, powered paragliders
- Website: www.pro-design.at

Pro-Design GmbH is an Austrian aircraft manufacturer based in Innsbruck. It was founded in 1986, in Natters. The company specializes in the design and manufacture of paragliders and powered parachute canopies, in the form of ready-to-fly aircraft.

The company is a Gesellschaft mit beschränkter Haftung, an Austrian limited liability company.

Reviewer Noel Bertrand described the company in a 2003 review as having a very "well-balanced range" of gliders. At that time the company's line included the two-place Carrier, beginner Effect, intermediate Jazz and Pro-Ject, plus the Titan.

The company also makes heavy parafoil wings under the name Sycon Aircraft.

== Aircraft ==
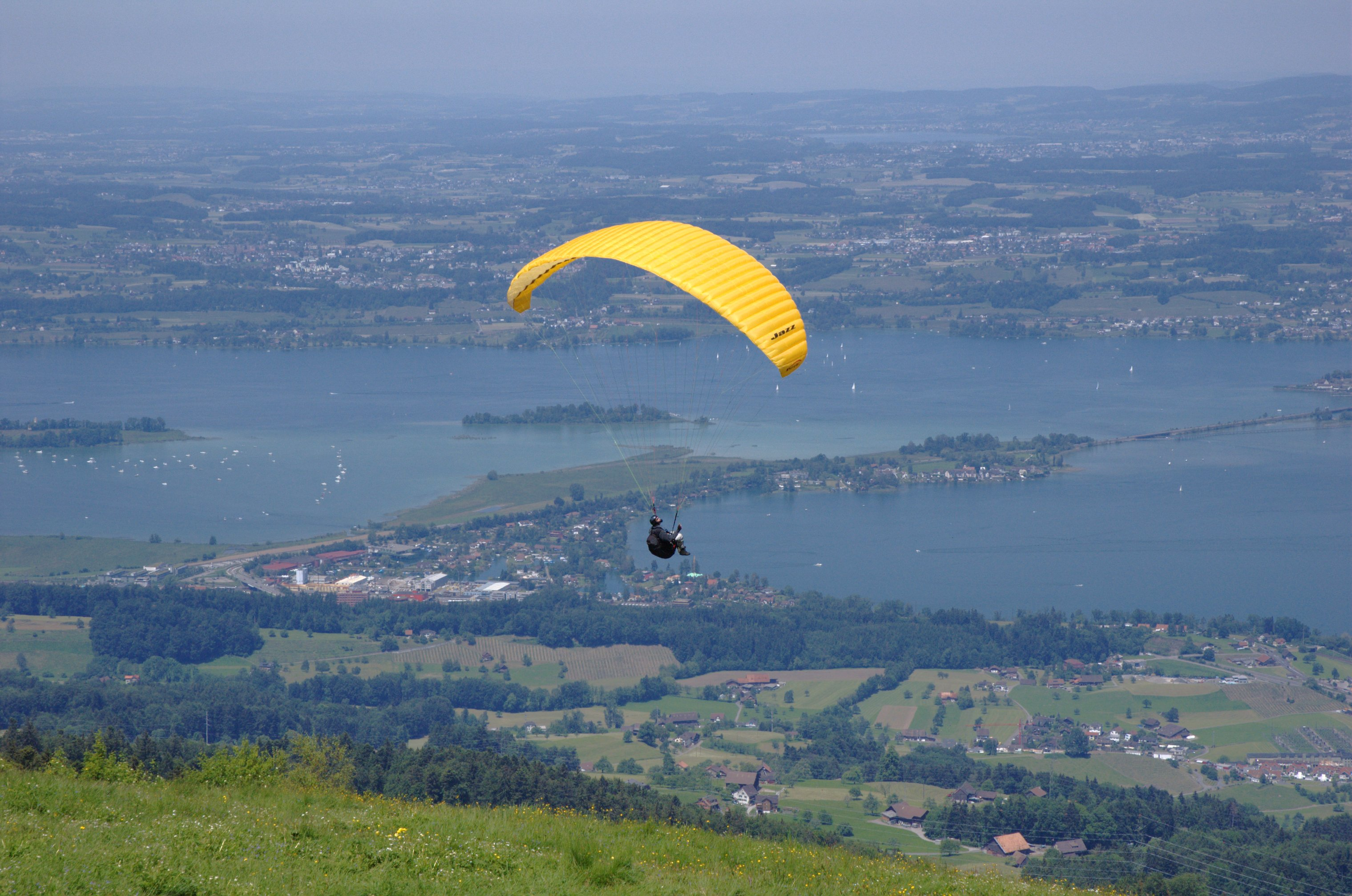
Pro-Design Jazz in flight.

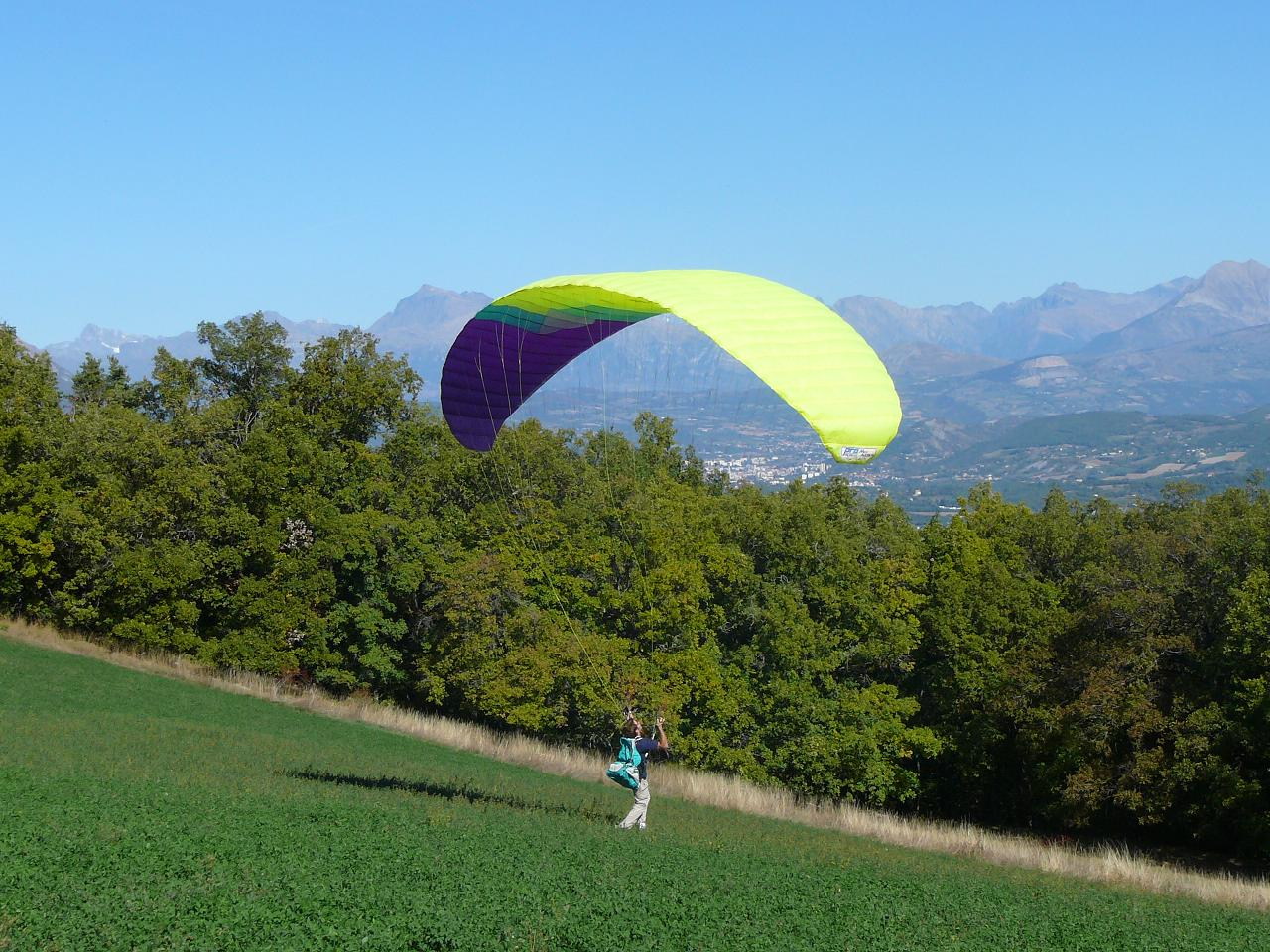
Pro-Design Compact.

Summary of aircraft built by Pro-Design:

- Pro-Design Accura
- Pro-Design Amiga
- Pro-Design Aquila
- Pro-Design Burst
- Pro-Design Corrado
- Pro-Design Carrier
- Pro-Design Challenger
- Pro-Design Combi-Cut
- Pro-Design Compact
- Pro-Design Companion
- Pro-Design Contest
- Pro-Design Eole
- Pro-Design Cuga
- Pro-Design Effect
- Pro-Design Fly
- Pro-Design High
- Pro-Design Jalpa
- Pro-Design Jazz
- Pro-Design Kestral
- Pro-Design Lamna
- Pro-Design Max
- Pro-Design Monster
- Pro-Design Pro-Feel
- Pro-Design Pro-Ject
- Pro-Design Relax
- Pro-Design Rrow
- Pro-Design Thema
- Pro-Design Thermik
- Pro-Design Thesis
- Pro-Design Titan
- Pro-Design X-Fire
