= Infection (journal) =

- Discipline: Virology, microbiology, pathology, infectious disease
- Language: English
- Edited by: Johannes R. Bogner

Publication details
- History: 1973–present
- Publisher: Springer Science+Business Media
- Frequency: Bimonthly
- License: Springer
- Impact factor: 7.455 (2021)

Standard abbreviations
- ISO 4: Infection

Indexing
- CODEN: IFTNAL
- ISSN: 0300-8126 (print); 1439-0973 (web)
- OCLC no.: 03388280

Links
- Journal homepage; Online access

Infection is a bimonthly peer-reviewed medical journal published by Springer Science+Business Media. It covers research on infectious diseases, including etiology, pathogenesis, diagnosis, and treatment in outpatient and inpatient settings.

== Types of articles ==
The journal publishes original research articles, brief reports, review articles, and case reports.

== Societies ==
Infection is the official publication of the following societies:

- German Society for Infectious Diseases
- Paul Ehrlich Society
- German Sepsis Society
- Italian Society of Infectious and Tropical Diseases

In addition, the journal collaborates with:

- European Society of Clinical Microbiology and Infectious Diseases
- European Society of Chemotherapy Infectious Diseases
- Swiss Society for Infectious Diseases

== Abstracting and indexing ==
The journal is abstracted and indexed in:

- Academic OneFile
- AGRICOLA
- Biological Abstracts
- BIOSIS Previews
- CAB Abstracts
- Chemical Abstracts Service
- CINAHL
- Current Contents/Life Sciences
- Current Contents/Clinical Medicine
- Elsevier Biobase
- EMBASE
- INIS Atomindex
- PubMed/MEDLINE
- Science Citation Index
- Scopus

According to the Journal Citation Reports, the journal has a 2018 impact factor of 2. 3.553.
