= Mabel Berezin =

American sociologist

Mabel Berezin is an American sociologist and a professor in the Department of Sociology at Cornell University.

== Education and career ==
Berezin earned a Ph.D. in sociology at Harvard University in 1987. She worked at Harvard as a lecturer from 1987 to 1989, as an assistant professor of sociology at the University of Pennsylvania from 1989 to 1996, and as a visiting associate professor at the University of California, Los Angeles from 1996 to 2001. She joined the Cornell University faculty in 2002, and chaired the sociology department there from 2010 to 2014.

== Books ==
Berezin is the author of:

- Illiberal Politics in Neoliberal Times: Culture, Security and Populism in the New Europe (Cambridge University Press, 2009) ISBN 978-0-521-83913-6.
- Europe without Borders: Remapping Territory, Citizenship, and Identity in a Transnational Age (with Martin Schain, Johns Hopkins University Press, 2003) ISBN 0-8018-7436-X.
- Making the Fascist Self: The Political Culture of Interwar Italy (Cornell University Press, 1997) ISBN 0-8014-3202-2.
