= Structure of feeling =

Academic concept

Structure of feeling is a term coined by literary theorist Raymond Williams.

The term describes the totality of cultural complexities that artists draw from. The term structure of feeling seeks to describe a complex experience, since structures of feeling capture something formative and difficult to articulate in ordinary language. In Preface to Film, Williams described structure of feeling as a more accurate term compared to words like “ideas” or “general life”

We examine each element as a precipitate, but in the living experience of the time every element was in solution, an inseparable part of a complex whole. And it seems to be true, from the nature of art, that it is from such a totality that the artist draws; it is in art, primarily, that the effect of the totality, the dominant structure of feeling, is expressed and embodied.

In The Long Revolution, Williams defined structure of feeling as:

...as firm and definite as “structure” suggests, yet it operates in the most delicate and least tangible parts of our activity. In one sense, this structure of feeling is the culture of a period: it is the particular living result of all the elements in the general organization.

These structures of feeling are defined differently by each generation within a time, of which there are usually three. However, Williams adds:

The way in which I have tended to apply the term in analysis is to the generation that is doing the new cultural work, which normally means a group which would have a median age of around thirty, when it is beginning to articulate its structure of feeling. It follows that one would then identify the structure of feeling of the middle-aged and the elderly with earlier decades. It was in that sense that I spoke of the structure of feeling of the 1840s. But I did not sufficiently clarify my procedure there.

Structures of feeling are emergent. As Williams himself stated:

Early Victorian ideology, for example, specified the exposure caused by poverty or by debt or by illegitimacy as social failure or deviation; the contemporary structure of feeling, meanwhile, in the new semantic figures of Dickens, of Emily Brontë, and others, specified exposure and isolation as a general condition, and poverty, debt, or illegitimacy as its connecting instances. An alternative ideology, relating such exposure to the nature of the social order, was only later generally formed: offering explanations but now at a reduced tension: the social explanation fully admitted, the intensity of experienced fear and shame now dispersed and generalized.

Williams defined the term differently throughout his career. Across these various definitions, structure of feeling can be considered at both a societal level (as in ‘spirit of the age’) or concerning the experiences of individual people. Largely, the term was used by Williams and others in analyses of literature and film, though it has since been more widely used in disciplines such as history and sociology.

== See also ==
- Affect theory
- Generation
- Ideology
