= Affect (rhetoric) =

Emotional feeling preceding cognition

Affect, as a term of rhetoric, is the responsive, emotional feeling (affect) that precedes cognition. Affect differs from pathos as described by Aristotle as one of the modes of proof and pathos as described by Jasinski as an emotional appeal because it is “the response we have to things before we label that response with feelings or emotions.”

In further exploring this term, scholars recognized affect’s rhetorical role in literature, photography, marketing and memory. In 2012, Rogers described how author W. E. B. Du Bois used the structure of his work, The Souls of Black Folk, to affect his audience into feeling shame. In 2016, Brunner and Deluca proposed the term affective winds to describe “the force of images that moves people to engage and interact by exploring the affective potency of visual arguments.” Affective winds were part of the rhetorical persuasiveness of images shared through social media. In a different sense, Harold described how the Target Corporation’s advertising used aura and affect to democratize the appearance of some products. Affect has also been identified as a conduit through which rhetorical memories can be internalized.

Drawing from philosophy, some rhetorical studies of affect have followed Martin Heidegger's articulation of Dasein which posits "affect" as the ground of reason. Others follow post-structuralist and post-Heideggerian insights to follow affect's influence on rhetorical canons and digital rhetoric.
