= Sue Roffey =

British & Australian psychologist and academic

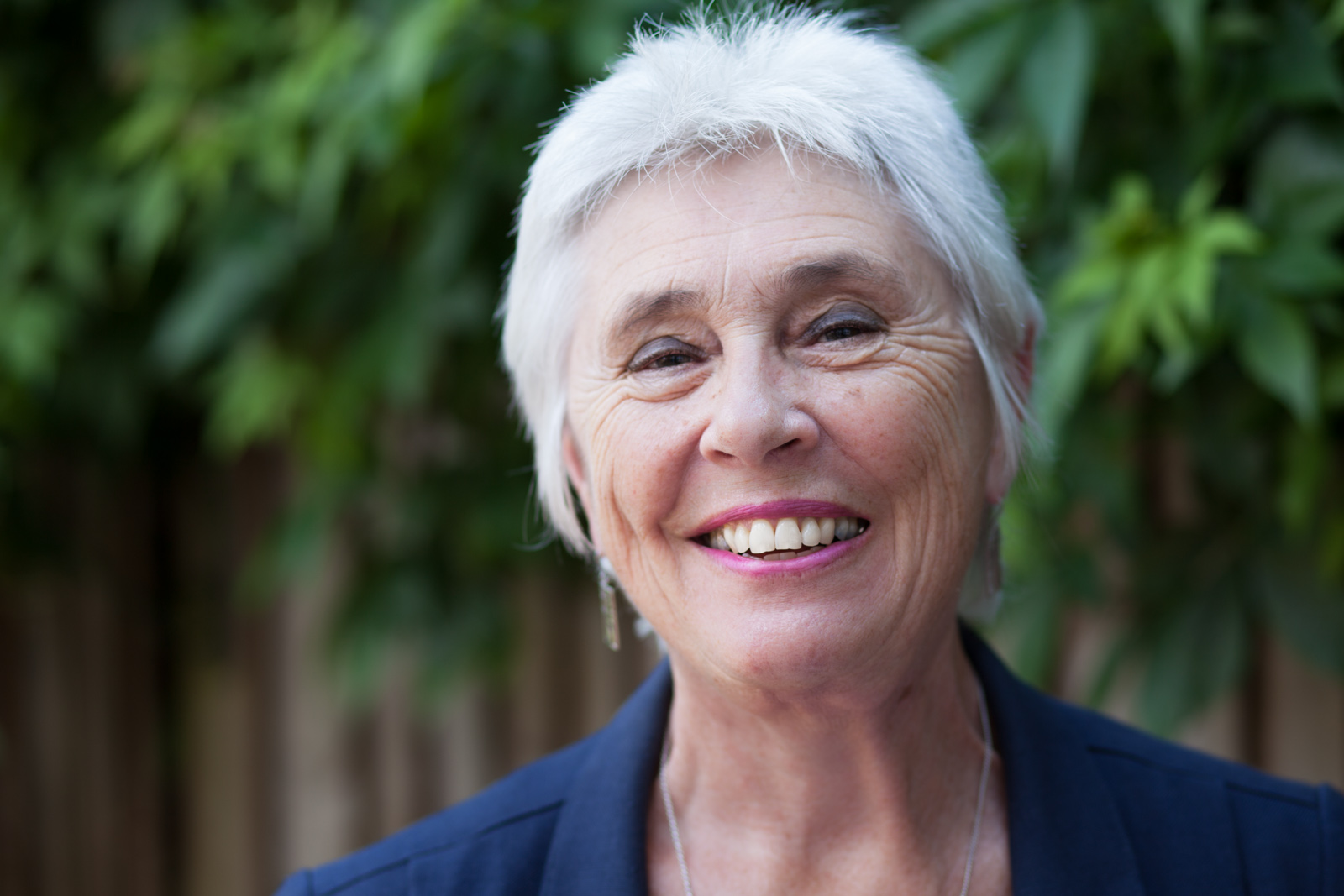
- Citizenship: British - Australian
- Education: University of Surrey; UCL Institute of Education; University of East London
- Scientific career
- Fields: Psychology - Education - Positive Psychology - Well-being

Sue (Suzanna) Roffey is a teacher, educational psychologist, academic and author. She is Honorary Associate Professor at University College London and an Affiliate of the Institute of Wellbeing in Cambridge, UK. She is a Fellow of the British Psychological Society (FBPsS), and a Fellow of the Royal Society of Arts (FRSA). She is a member of the Expert Group for the OECD’s project New Perspectives on Childhood and an Ambassador for the Council for Learning Outside the Classroom, and was a member of the advisory board of the Carnegie Centre of Excellence for Mental Health in Schools, a member of the Steering Group for the Global Citizenship Foundation’s International Conference on Transformative Education 2025 for Human and Planetary Flourishing, and a past member of the editorial board of Educational and Child Psychology. She was the founder of Wellbeing Australia.

== Career ==
Sue Roffey trained as a teacher, and spent most of her teaching career working with students experiencing emotional, social and behavioural challenges. After a master's degree in the education of children with special needs at the University College London Institute of Education, she went on to qualify there as an educational psychologist. She worked as an educational psychologist in Essex and in the London Borough of Haringey, finishing as the principal psychologist. After completing her doctorate in educational psychology at UEL, she moved to Australia, and subsequently began teaching on the training course for school counsellors at the University of Western Sydney (UWS). As her writing and external training developed she moved to an adjunct position at UWS and began working internationally. Roffey has developed Circle Solutions, a framework for social and emotional learning based in the ASPIRE principles of Agency, Safety, Positivity, Inclusion, Respect and Equity. This is now used internationally and is the subject of two books published by Routledge in 2024. Dr Roffey is teaching modules on the Masters of Applied Positive Psychology in Reykjavik, Iceland and at Anglia Ruskin University in Cambridge (Education) and at the University of East London (Childhood). Her work on Creating the World We Want to Live In has led to podcasts with Professor Isaac Prilleltensky and a strong interest in promoting an education system that works for all young people in the 21st century. In 2024 the UK National Association for Pastoral Care in Education awarded her for Outstanding Contribution to Pastoral Care.

== Published books ==
Handbook on Wellbeing in Education: Research Transforming Practice (Edward Elgar, 2027, in press) edited, with co-editor Ansie Kitching

ASPIRE to Wellbeing and Learning for All in Secondary Settings: The Principles Underpinning Positive Education (Routledge, 2024)

ASPIRE to Wellbeing and Learning for All in Early Years and Primary: The Principles Underpinning Positive Education (Routledge, 2024)

Creating the World We Want to Live In, (Routledge, 2021), with Bridget Grenville-Cleave, Dóra Guđrun Guđmundsdottir, Felicia Huppert, Vanessa King, David Roffey and Marten de Vries.

Circle Solutions for Student Wellbeing: Relationships, Resilience and Responsibility (3rd Edition), (Sage, 2020): the second edition was published 2014, first edition (Circle Time for Emotional Literacy) in 2006.

The Wellbeing Stories, (Growing Great Schools, 2019) - six stories for 8-11-year-olds addressing emotional issues, each accompanied by guidebooks on the issue for families, and workbooks for teachers with activities for children to explore these.

The Secondary Behaviour Cookbook: Strategies at Your Fingertips, (Routledge, 2018).

The Primary Behaviour Cookbook Strategies at your Fingertips, (Routledge, 2018).

Special Needs in the Early Years: Supporting collaboration, communication and co-ordination, (Routledge, 2013) 3rd Edition with John Parry: second edition was published in 2001, first edition in 1999.

Positive Relationships: Evidence-based practice around the world, (Editor, Springer, 2012).

Changing Behaviour in Schools: Promoting Positive Relationships and Wellbeing, (Sage, 2010): also available in Danish, Positive læringsrelationer i skolen, (Dansk Psykologisk, 2012).

The New Teacher's Survival Guide to Behaviour, 2nd Edition, (Sage, 2011): first edition was published in 2004: also available in Polish, Jak przetrwać w szkole? Przewodnik dla nauczycieli (Wydawnictw Szkolne i Pedagogiczne Spółka, 2008).

Whole Child: Promoting Social and Emotional Wellbeing: Teacher's Resource Books (*3), (Penguin Australia, 2008).

A scoping study on school wellbeing, Toni Noble, Helen McGrath, Sue Roffey & Louise Rowling, (Department of Education, Employment & Workplace Relations (DEEWR), Australian Commonwealth Government, 2008).

Helping with Behaviour: Establishing the Positive and Addressing the Difficult in the Early Years, (Routledge, 2005).

Plans for Better Behaviour in the Primary School, (David Fulton, 2003), with Terry O'Reirdan.

School Behaviour and Families : Frameworks for Working Together, (David Fulton, 2002).

Young Children and Classroom Behaviour: Needs, Perspectives and Strategies, (David Fulton, 2001), with Terry O'Reirdan: also available in Spanish translation: previously published as Infant Classroom Behaviour (David Fulton, 1997).

Young Friends: Schools and Friendship, (Cassell, 1994), with Tony Tarrant and Karen Majors: also available in Danish, Er du min ven? Om bǿrns venskab, (Dansk Psykologisk, 1999).
