= Cult of personality =

Idolization of a leader

A cult of personality, or a cult of the leader, is the result of an effort to create an idealized and heroic image of a leader such that they are portrayed as admirable regardless of whether or not they are. It is often achieved through unquestioning flattery and praise.

Historically, it has been developed through techniques such as the manipulation of the mass media, the dissemination of propaganda, the staging of spectacles, the manipulation of the arts, the instilling of patriotism, and government-organized demonstrations and rallies. A cult of personality is similar to apotheosis (deification), except that it is established through the use of modern social engineering techniques, and it is usually established by the state or the party in one-party states and dominant-party states. Cults of personality often accompany the leaders of totalitarian or authoritarian governments. They can also be found in some monarchies, theocracies, failed democracies, and liberal democracies.

== Background ==
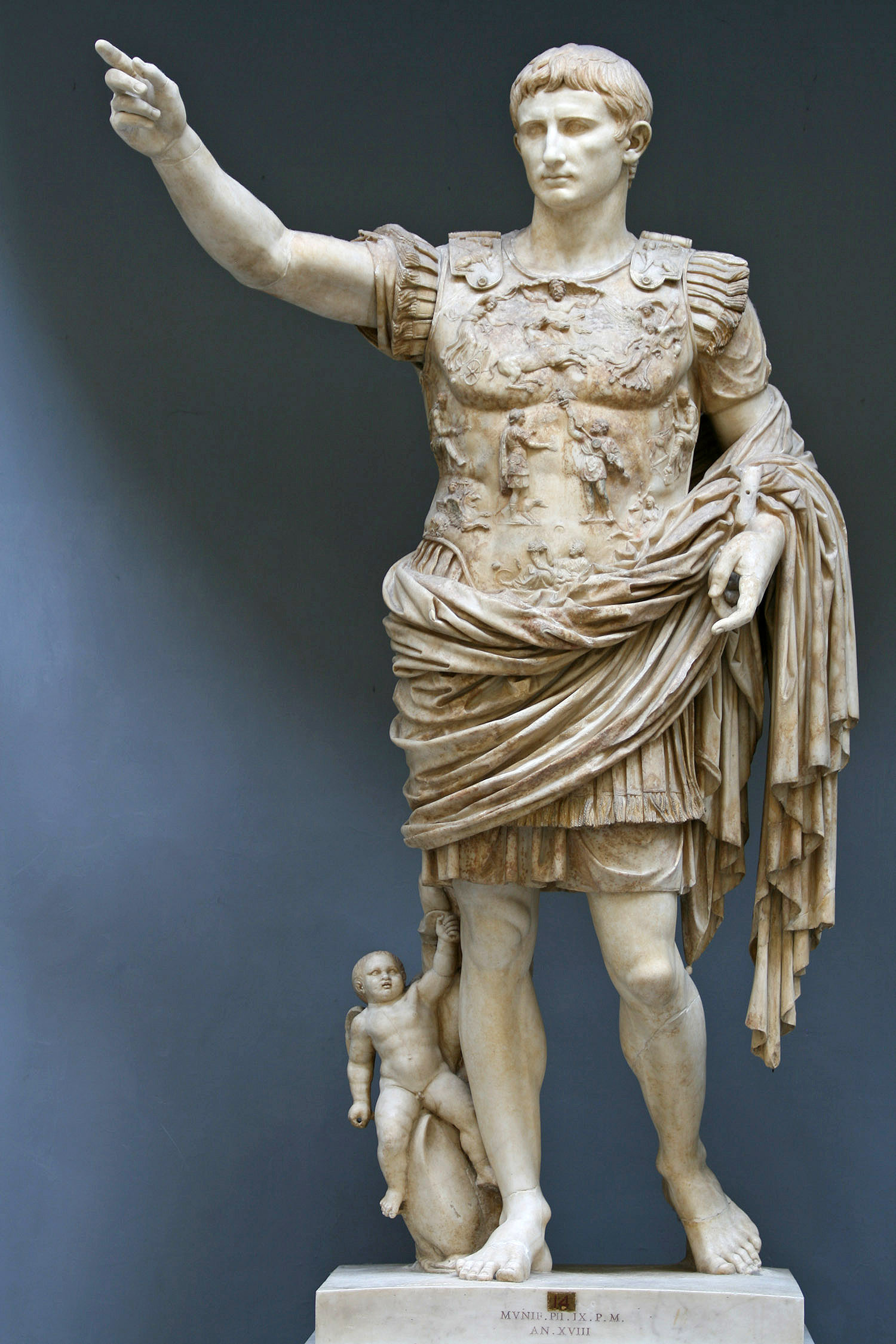
Augustus of Prima Porta, 1st century CE

Throughout human history, monarchs and other heads of state were frequently treated with enormous reverence, and they were also thought to be endowed with superhuman qualities. Through the principle of the divine right of kings, notably in medieval Europe, rulers were said to hold office by the will of God or the will of the gods. Ancient Egypt, Imperial Japan, the Inca, the Aztecs, Tibet, Siam (now Thailand), and the Roman Empire are especially noted for their redefinition of monarchs as "god-kings." The Emperor of China also used the title Son of Heaven. Furthermore, the Imperial cult of ancient Rome identified emperors and some members of their families with the divinely sanctioned authority (auctoritas) of the Roman State.

The spread of democratic and secular ideas in Europe and North America in the 18th and 19th centuries made it increasingly difficult for monarchs to preserve this aura, though Napoleon III and Queen Victoria appreciated its perpetuation in their carte-de-visite portraits which proliferated, circulated and were collected in the 19th century.

The subsequent development of mass media, such as radio, enabled political leaders to project a positive image of themselves onto the masses as never before. It was under these circumstances in the 20th century that the most notorious personality cults arose. Frequently, these cults are a form of political religion.

The advent of the Internet and the World Wide Web in the 21st century has renewed the personality cult phenomenon. Disinformation via social media platforms and the twenty-four hour news cycle has enabled the widespread dissemination and acceptance of deceptive information and propaganda. As a result, personality cults have grown and remained popular in many places, corresponding with a marked rise in authoritarian government across the world.

The term "cult of personality" likely appeared in English around 1800–1850, along with the French and German versions of the term. It initially had no political connotations but was instead closely related to the Romanticist "cult of genius." The first known political use of the phrase appeared in a letter from Karl Marx to German political worker Wilhelm Blos dated to November 10, 1877:

Neither of us cares a straw of popularity. Let me cite one proof of this: such was my aversion to the personality cult [orig. Personenkultus] that at the time of the International, when plagued by numerous moves ... to accord me public honor, I never allowed one of these to enter the domain of publicity ...

== Characteristics ==
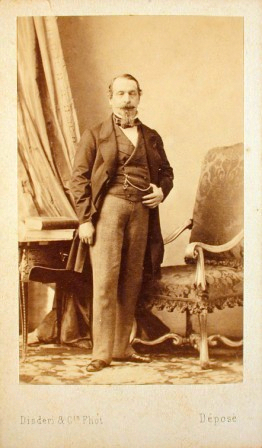
1859 carte de visite of Napoleon III by Disdéri, which popularized the carte-de-visite format

There are various views about what constitutes a cult of personality in a leader. Historian Jan Plamper wrote that modern-day personality cults display five characteristics that set them apart from "their predecessors": The cults are secular and "anchored in popular sovereignty"; their objects are all males; they target the entire population, not only the well-to-do or just the ruling class; they use mass media; they exist where the mass media can be controlled enough to inhibit the introduction of "rival cults."

In his 2013 paper, "What is character and why it really does matter," Thomas A. Wright stated, "The cult of personality phenomenon refers to the idealized, even god-like, public image of an individual consciously shaped and molded through constant propaganda and media exposure. As a result, one is able to manipulate others based entirely on the influence of public personality ... the cult of personality perspective focuses on the often shallow, external images that many public figures cultivate to create an idealized and heroic image."

Adrian Teodor Popan defined a cult of personality as a "quantitatively exaggerated and qualitatively extravagant public demonstration of praise of the leader." He also identified three causal "necessary, but not sufficient, structural conditions and a path-dependent chain of events which, together, lead to the cult formation: a particular combination of patrimonialism and clientelism, lack of dissidence, and systematic falsification pervading the society's culture."

One underlying characteristic, as explained by John Pittman, is that the cult of personalities is patriarchal in nature. The idea of a cult of personality associated with the Marxist movements gains popular footing among the men in power, with the idea that they would be the "fathers of the people." By the end of the 1920s, the male features of the cults became more extreme. Pittman identifies that these features became roles, including the "formal role for a [male] 'great leader' as a cultural focus of the apparatus of the regime: reliance on top-down 'administrative measures' and a pyramidal structure of authority," which was created by a single ideal.

== Role of mass media ==
Writing in 2013, Thomas A. Wright observed that "[i]t is becoming evident that the charismatic leader, especially in politics, has increasingly become the product of media and self-exposure." Focusing on the media in the United States, Robert N. Bellah added, "It is hard to determine the extent to which the media reflect the cult of personality in American politics and to what extent they have created it. Surely they did not create it all alone, but just as surely they have contributed to it. In any case, American politics is dominated by the personalities of political leaders to an extent rare in the modern world ... in the personalized politics of recent years, the 'charisma' of the leader may be almost entirely a product of media exposure."

== Purpose ==
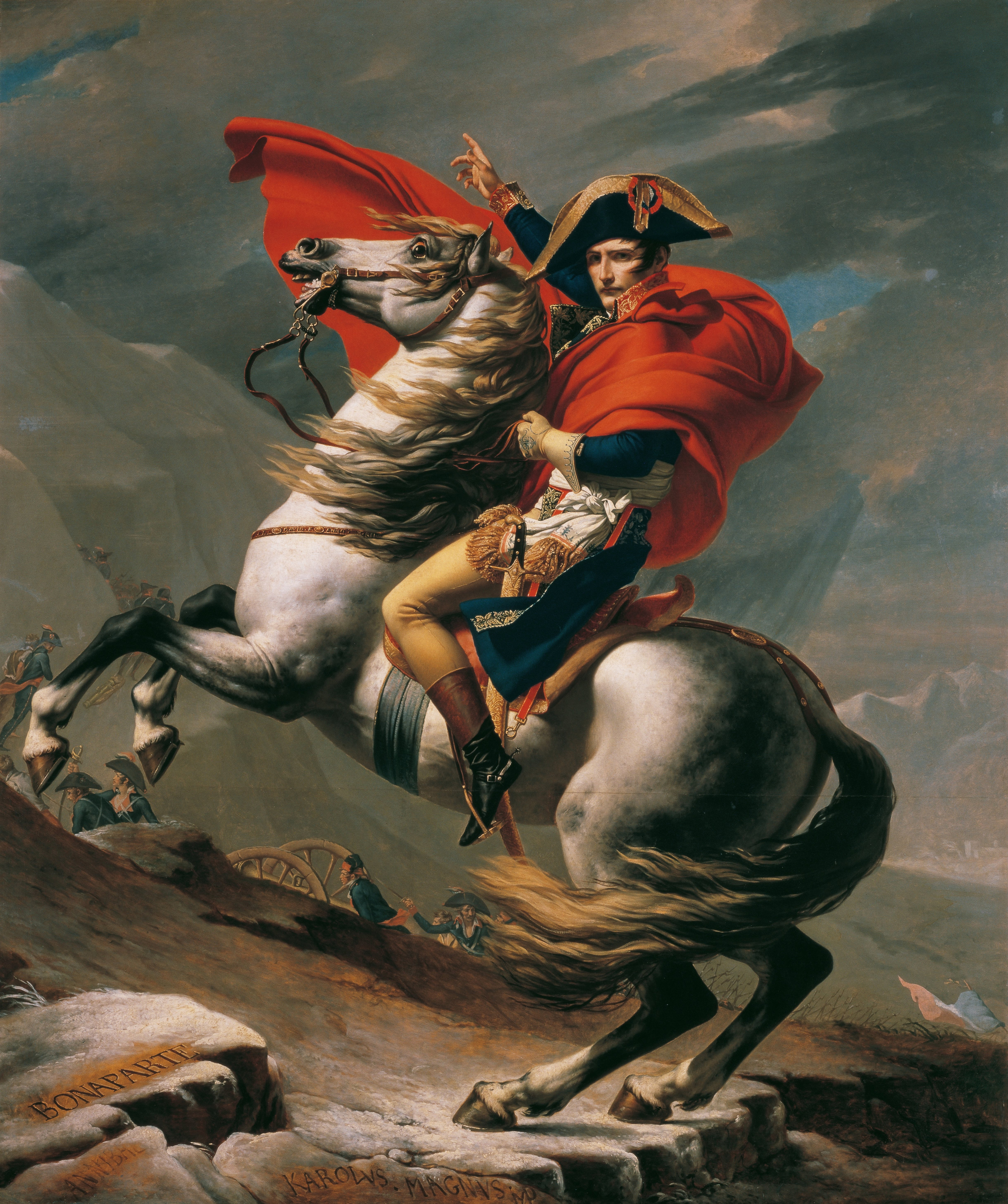
Napoleon Crossing the Alps, romantic version by Jacques-Louis David in 1805

Jan Plamper argues while Napoleon III made some innovations in France, it was Benito Mussolini in Italy in the 1920s who originated the model of dictator-as-cult-figure that was emulated by Hitler, Stalin and the others, using the propaganda powers of a totalitarian state.

Pierre du Bois de Dunilac argues that the Stalin cult was elaborately constructed to legitimize his rule. Many deliberate distortions and falsehoods were used. The Kremlin refused access to archival records that might reveal the truth, and key documents were destroyed. Photographs were altered, and documents were invented. People who knew Stalin were forced to provide "official" accounts to meet the ideological demands of the cult, especially as Stalin himself presented it in 1938 in Short Course on the History of the All-Union Communist Party (Bolsheviks), which became the official history.

Historian David L. Hoffmann states, "The Stalin cult was a central element of Stalinism, and as such it was one of the most salient features of Soviet rule ... Many scholars of Stalinism cite the cult as integral to Stalin's power or as evidence of Stalin's megalomania."

In Latin America, Cas Mudde and Cristóbal Rovira Kaltwasser link the "cult of the leader" to the concept of the caudillo, a strong leader "who exercises a power that is independent of any office and free of any constraint." These populist strongmen are portrayed as "masculine and potentially violent" and enhance their authority through the use of the cult of personality. Mudde and Kaltwasser trace the linkage back to Juan Perón of Argentina.

== States and systems with personality cults ==
=== Argentina ===
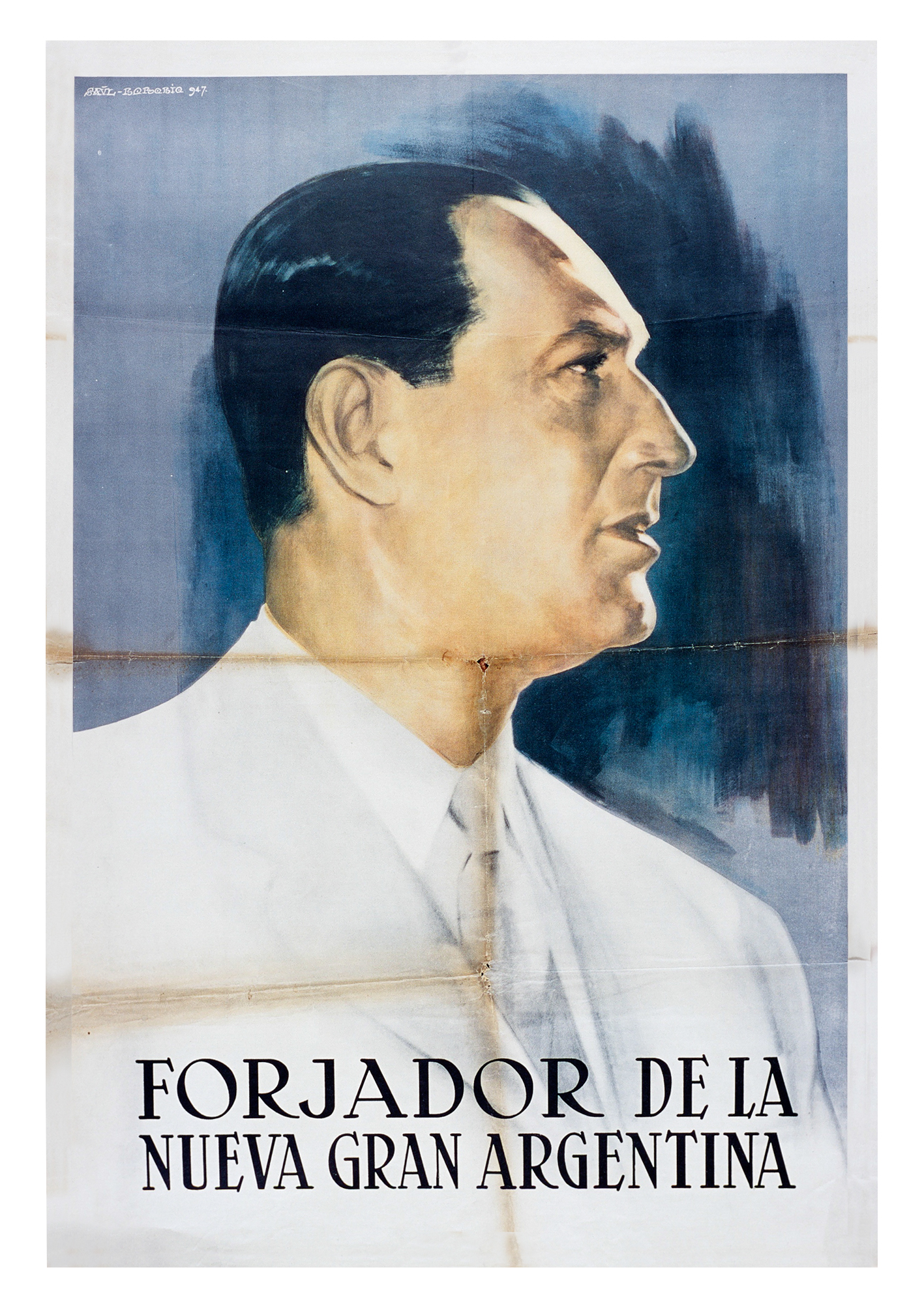
"Smith of the New Great Argentina" (poster 1947)

Juan Perón, who was elected three times as President of Argentina, and his second wife, Eva "Evita" Perón, were immensely popular among many of the Argentine people, and to this day they are still considered icons by the leading Justicialist Party. In contrast, both academics and detractors often considered him a demagogue and a dictator. Perón sympathized with the Axis powers when he was a colonel and Minister of War and even served as a diplomatic envoy to Fascist Italy. During his regime, he kept close ties with Francoist Spain.

He ferociously persecuted dissenters and potential political rivals, as political arrests were common during his first two terms. He eroded the republican principles of the country as a way to stay in power and forced statewide censorship on most media. Following his election, he built a personality cult around both himself and his wife so pervasive it is still a part of Argentina's current political life.

During Perón's regime, schools were forced to read Evita's biography, La Razón de mi Vida, union and government jobs were only given to those who could prove themselves to be fervent Peronists; newspapers were censored, and television and radio networks were nationalized, with only state media being allowed. He often showed contempt for any opponents, regularly characterizing them as traitors and agents of foreign powers. Those who did not fall in line or were perceived as a threat to Perón's political power were subject to losing their jobs, threats, violence, and harassment.

Perón dismissed over 20,000 university professors and faculty members from all major public education institutions. Universities were then intervened in, the faculty was pressured to get in line, and those who resisted were blacklisted, dismissed or exiled. Numerous prominent cultural and intellectual figures were imprisoned. Thousands of artists, scientists, writers and academics left the country and migrated to North America or Europe. Union leaders and political rivals were arrested and tortured for years and were only released after Perón was deposed.

=== Azerbaijan ===
Heydar's cult of personality began in 1993 when he took power in post-Soviet Azerbaijan.

=== Bangladesh ===
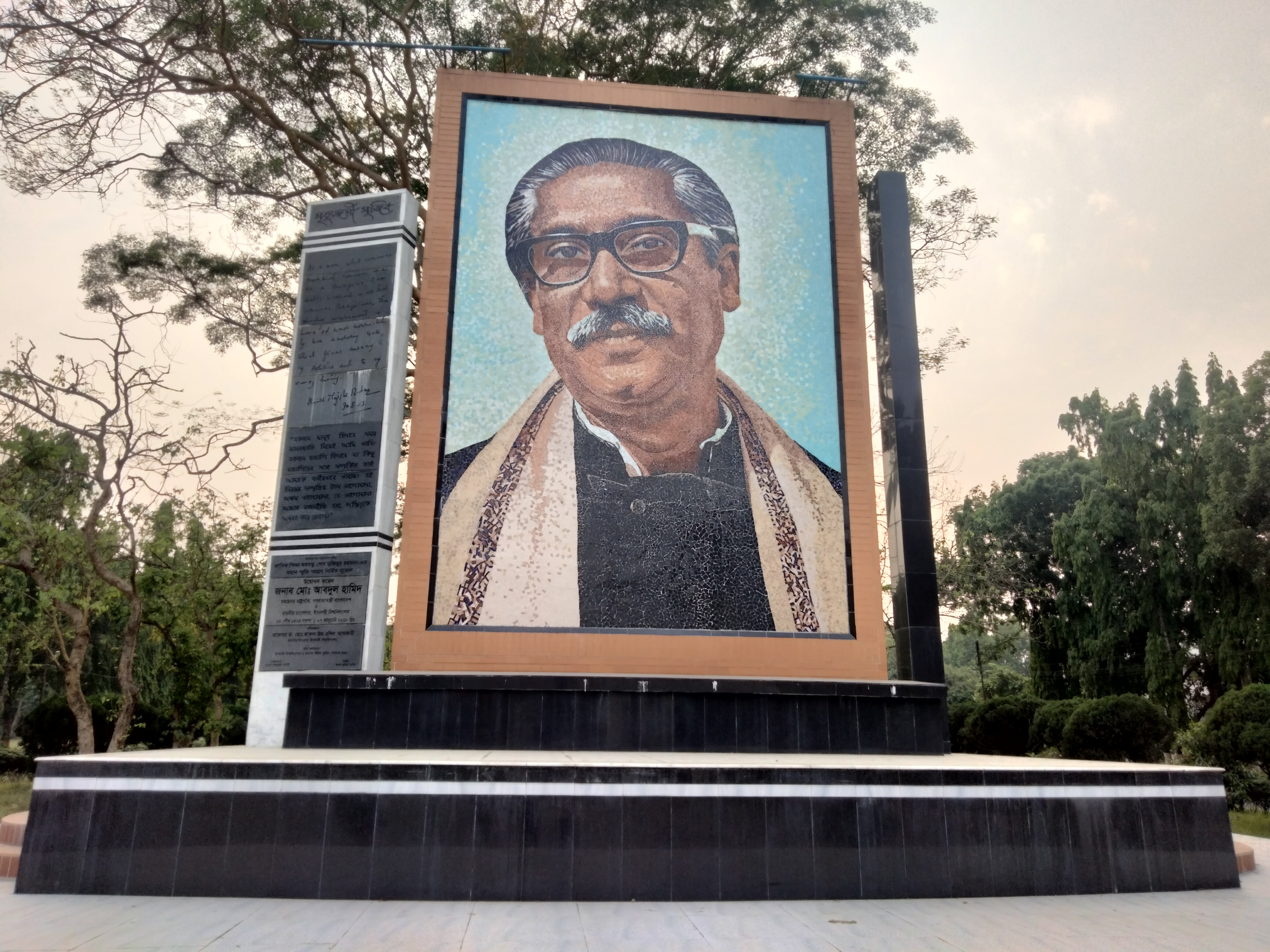
Mritunjoyi Mujib at Islamic University in Kushtia. It was demolished after the Student–People's uprising in August 2024.

Mujibism initially began as the political ideology of Sheikh Mujibur Rahman ("Mujib," 1920-1975), who led Bangladesh's secession from Pakistan in 1971. From 2008 onwards, Mujib's daughter, Sheikh Hasina, gradually converted Mujibism into a cult of personality around her father. After being pushed to the sidelines by two successive military dictators —Ziaur Rehman (who founded the Bangladesh Nationalist Party) and Hussain Muhammad Ershad (who founded the National Party)—the figure of the late Mujib returned to dominate public consciousness from 2008 under the Awami League government led by Hasina.

Hasina has been criticized for overemphasizing the role of her father and of the Awami League in securing Bangladeshi independence at the cost of sidelining other prominent figures and political parties of the time. Hasina had amended the constitution to make the presence of Mujib's portrait mandatory in every school, government office and diplomatic mission in the country and made it illegal to criticize Mujib, his ideals or his deeds, especially the one-party BAKSAL regime (1972–75) headed by him, through writing, speech or electronic media. Many events commemorating the birth centenary of Bangabandhu ('Friend of Bengal' in Bengali, the honorific unofficial title given to Mujib in his lifetime) were launched by the Hasina administration, including an official biopic in collaboration with the Indian government.

The Hasina government converted Mujib's residence in the capital city of Dhaka, where he and his family were assassinated by mutinous military personnel in 1975, into a memorial museum. Hasina designated the day of Mujib's assassination as the National Day of Mourning. The Hasina government also made the birthdays of Mujib, his wife Sheikh Fazilatunessa, eldest son Sheikh Kamal, and youngest son Sheikh Russel official government holidays, alongside March 7 (on that day in 1971, Mujib declared Bangladesh's secession at a speech in Dhaka).

Under Hasina's rule, the country was dotted with numerous statues of Mujib alongside several roads and prominent institutions named after him. Critics state that Hasina utilized the personality cult around her father to justify her own authoritarianism, crackdown on political dissent, and democratic backsliding of the country. Following the violent overthrow of Sheikh Hasina in 2024, the cult of personality around Mujib is being systematically dismantled.

=== Cambodia ===
The Cambodian leader Pol Pot ("Saloth Sar") became "Brother Number One" as the secretive public figure, and the regime did not cultivate a cult of personality around him. Instead, he and the Khmer Rouge used the faceless, abstract concept of Angkar (អង្គការ angkaa), a Khmer word for "Organization" to represent the revolutionary party in Cambodia. Following the Fall of Phnom Penh and the end of the Cambodian Civil War on 17 April 1975, Angkar was presented as the supreme, all-knowing authority to whom all loyalty was owed, as it sees everything, and was used to assert the organization's total control over Democratic Kampuchea as its constitution on 5 January 1976. As the highest authority, Angkar was part of the regime's clandestine Maoist ideology.

The Cambodian People's Party (CPP) won all 125 seats in the 2018 general election, effectively turning the country into a single-party state as part of the political landscape has undergone a dynastic transition of Hun Sen (who has been in power as Prime Minister from 1985 until 2023) and his son Hun Manet. Sen remained president of the ruling CPP, which political analysts say gives him ultimate control over the country, while his son Hun Manet became the next Prime Minister since August 2023, but the CPP itself was an entity, not a personality cult.

=== China ===
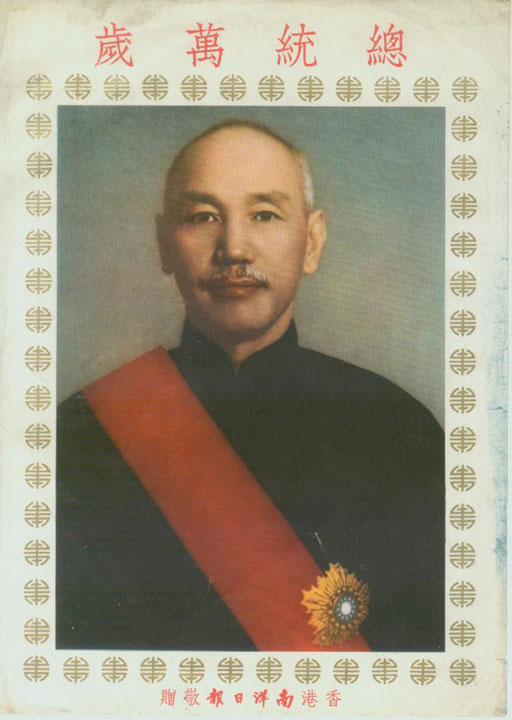
ROC-China propaganda poster proclaiming "Long Live the President", glorifying Chiang Kai Shek

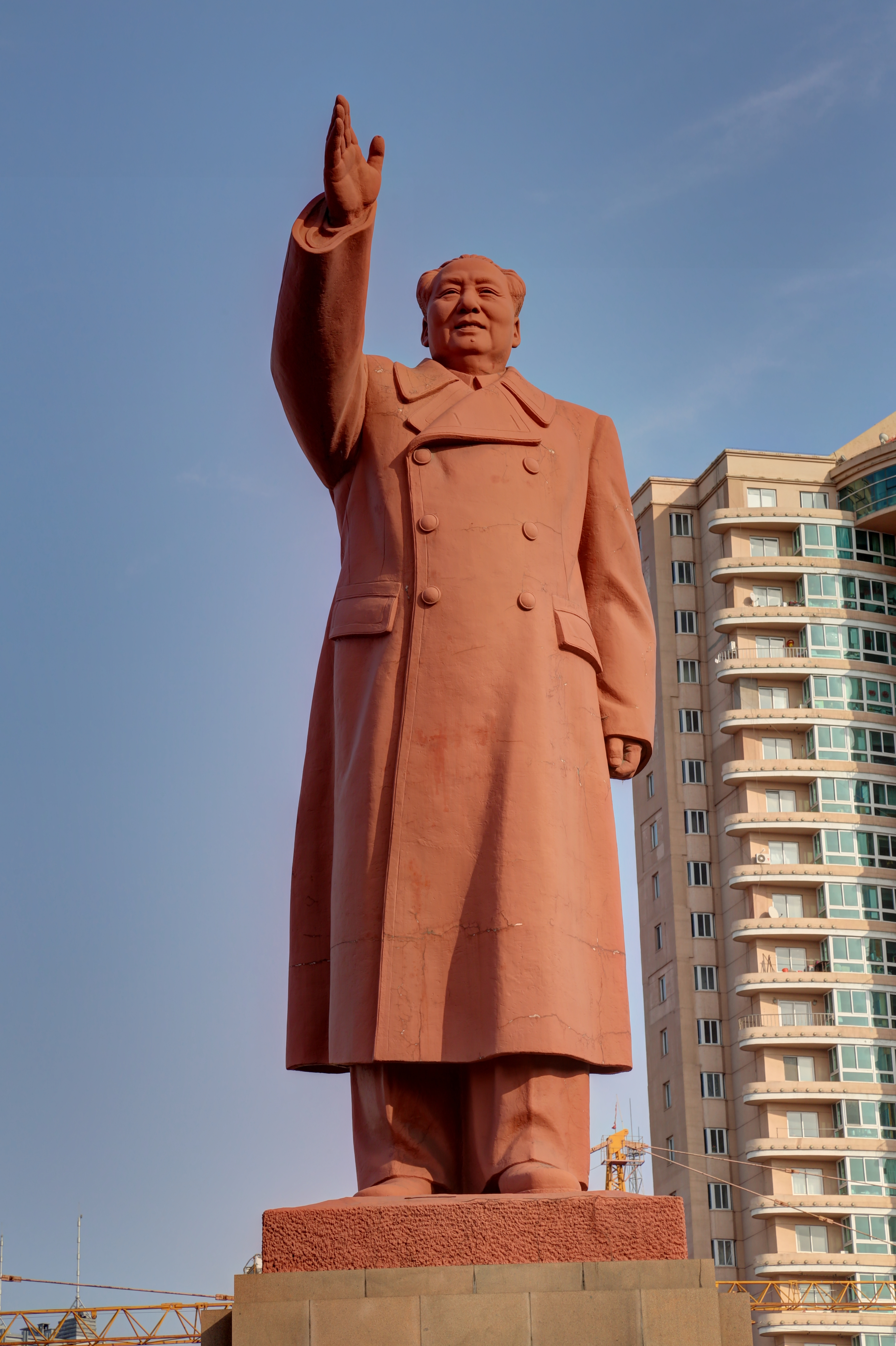
Statue of Mao Zedong in China

Mao Zedong's cult of personality was a prominent part of Chairman Mao Zedong's rule over the People's Republic of China from his rise in 1949 until his death in 1976. Mass media, propaganda and a series of other techniques were used by the state to elevate Mao Zedong's status to that of an infallible heroic leader, who could stand up against The West, and guide China to become a beacon of Communism. Mao himself, however, publicly criticized the personality cult that was formed around him.

During the period of the Cultural Revolution, Mao's personality cult soared to an unprecedented height. Mao's face was firmly established on the front page of People's Daily, where a column of his quotes was also printed every day. Mao's Selected Works were later printed in even greater circulation; the number of his portraits (1.2 billion) was more than the inhabitants in China. And soon Chairman Mao badges began to appear; in total, about 4.8 billion were manufactured.

Every Chinese citizen was presented with the Little Red Book – a selection of quotes from Mao. It was prescribed to be carried everywhere and displayed at all public events, and citizens were expected to quote the contents of the book daily. Mao himself believed that the situation had gone out of hand, and in a conversation with Edgar Snow in 1970, he denounced the titles of "Great Leader, Great Supreme Commander, Great Helmsman" and insisted on only being called "teacher." Admiration for Mao Zedong has remained widespread in China in spite of somewhat general knowledge of his actions. In December 2013, a Global Times poll revealed that over 85% of Chinese viewed Mao's achievements as outweighing his mistakes.

Chiang Kai-shek had a cult of personality. His portraits were commonly displayed in private homes, and they were also commonly displayed in public on the streets. When the Muslim general and warlord Ma Lin was interviewed, he was described as having "high admiration for and unwavering loyalty to Chiang Kai-shek."

After the Cultural Revolution, Deng Xiaoping and others launched the "Boluan Fanzheng" program, which invalidated the Cultural Revolution and abandoned (and forbade) the use of a personality cult.

A cult of personality has been developing around Xi Jinping since he became General Secretary of the ruling Chinese Communist Party and the regime's paramount leader in 2012.

=== Dominican Republic ===
Longtime dictator of the Dominican Republic Rafael Trujillo (ruled 1930–1961) was the center of a large personality cult. The nation's capital city, its highest peak, and a province were renamed for him. Statues of "El Jefe" were mass-produced and erected across the country, and bridges and public buildings were named in his honor.

Automobile license plates included slogans such as "¡Viva Trujillo!" and "Año Del Benefactor De La Patria" (Year of the Benefactor of the Nation). An electric sign was erected in Ciudad Trujillo so that "Dios y Trujillo" could be seen at night as well as in the day. Eventually, even churches were required to post the slogan "Dios en el cielo, Trujillo en la tierra" (God in Heaven, Trujillo on Earth). As time went on, the order of the phrases was reversed (Trujillo on Earth, God in Heaven).

=== Haiti ===
François Duvalier, also known as Papa Doc, was a Haitian politician who served as the president of Haiti from 1957 until his death in 1971. He was elected president in the 1957 general election on a populist and black nationalist platform. After thwarting a military coup d'état in 1958, his regime rapidly became more autocratic and despotic.

An undercover government death squad, the Tonton Macoute (Haitian Creole: Tonton Makout), indiscriminately tortured or killed Duvalier's opponents; the Tonton Macoute was thought to be so pervasive that Haitians became highly fearful of expressing any form of dissent, even in private. Duvalier further sought to solidify his rule by incorporating elements of Haitian mythology into a personality cult.

=== Hungary ===
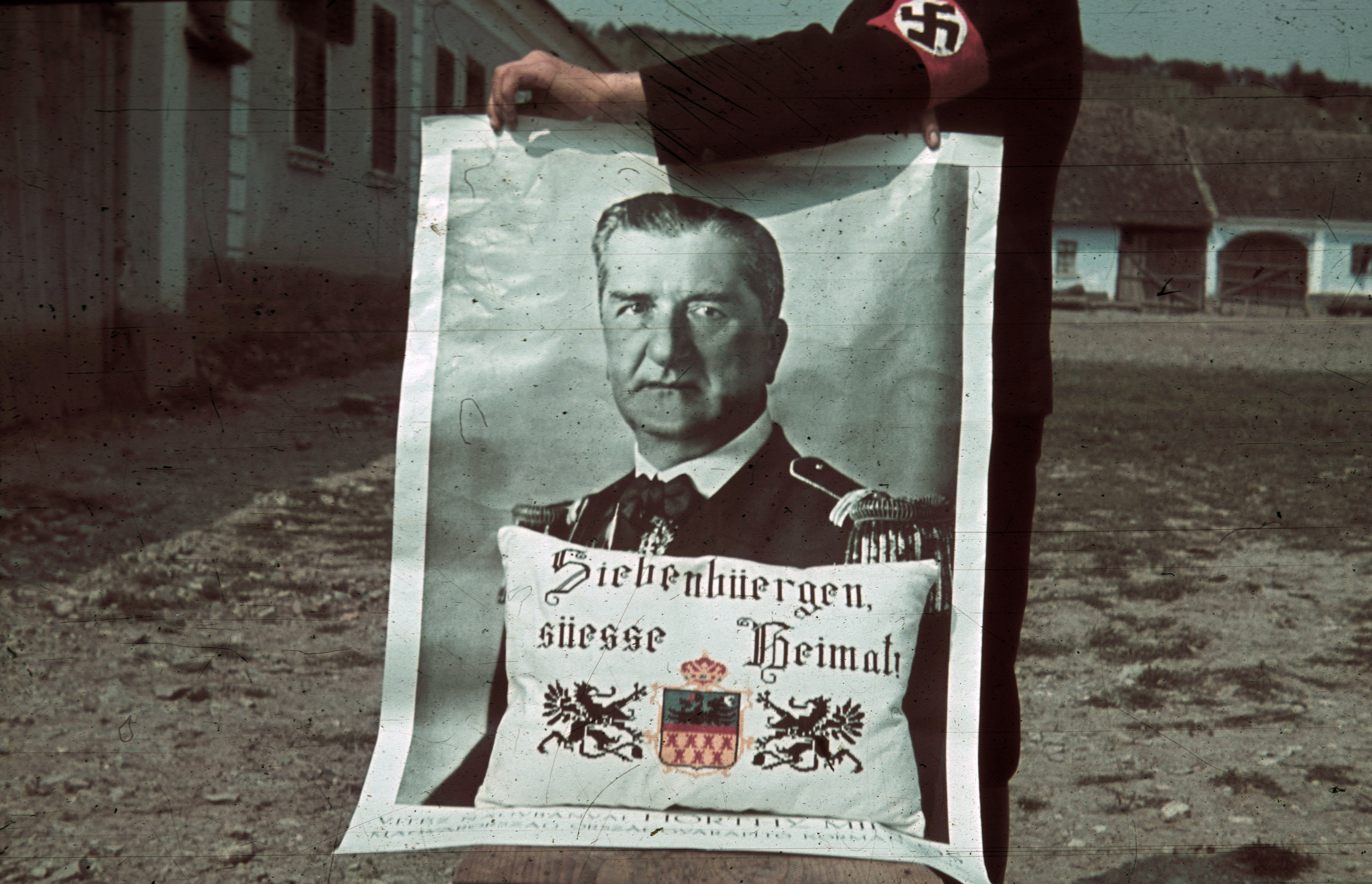
Nazi official with a portrait of Miklós Horthy, 1940

The cult of Miklós Horthy, who became the head of state of the Kingdom of Hungary after the dissolution of Austria-Hungary and the counter-revolutionary terror after World War I, was one of the first personality cults to be established in interwar Europe. Horthy was presented as the only person capable of achieving the national goals and restoring the lost national glory. Horthy built the Hungarian national identity around Christianity, and in order to maintain his own cult, Horthy actively manipulated Christian symbols and concepts, namely resurrection, rebirth, salvation, the Passion of the Christ, selectness, the promised land, and references to the will of divine providence for justifying Horthy's rule.

=== India ===
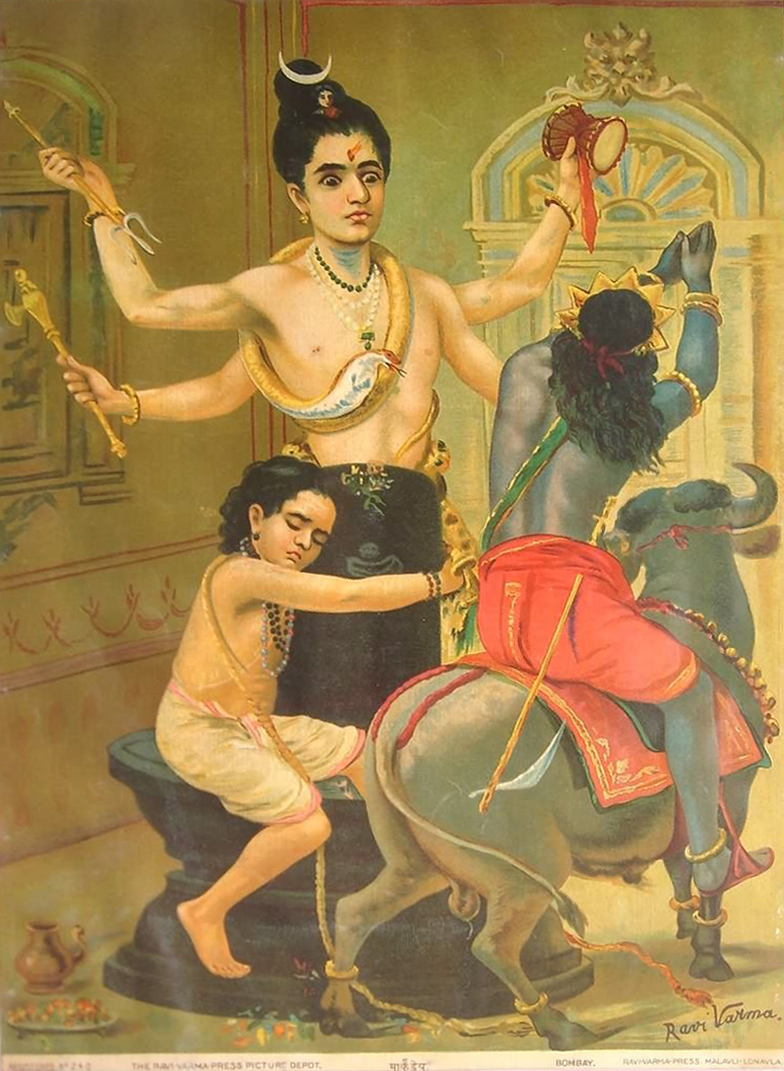
Lithograph printed in 1910 from Bombay's Ravi Varma Press, depicting the Hindu God Shiva's Kalantaka form, protecting Markandeya (who is hugging a Shivalinga) from the snares of Yama

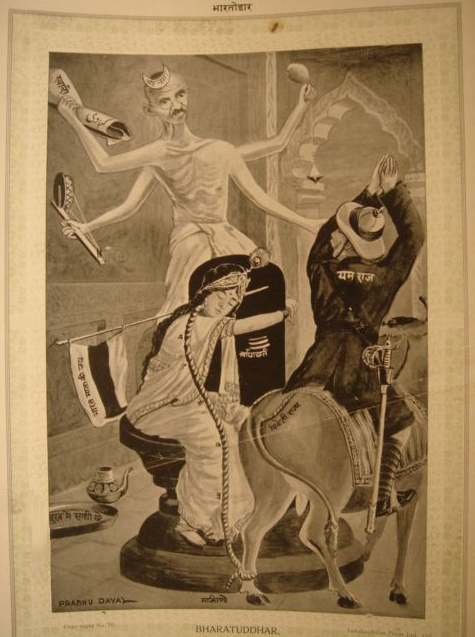
Lithograph printed in 1930s, heavily plagiarizing from the original one, with Gandhi posing as Shiva, protecting Bharat Mata (who replaces Markandeya in this version) from the snares of a British colonial officer, who is labelled as Yama

During the days of the freedom struggle, Mahatma Gandhi had a cult-like following amongst the people of India. Congress leaders like Chittaranjan Das and Subhash Chandra Bose, who opposed Gandhi's methods, found themselves sidelined within the party. The assassination of Gandhi in 1948 led to widespread violence against Marathi Brahmins by his followers.

After Gandhi's death, his cult was eclipsed by another personality cult that had developed around India's first prime minister, Jawaharlal Nehru. C Rajagopalachari criticized the personality cult surrounding Nehru, saying that there should be an opposition group within the Congress. Rajagopalachari later formed the economically right-wing Swatantra Party in opposition to Nehru's socialist economic view. The expression 'Nehruvian consensus' reflects the dominance of Nehruvian ideals, a product of Nehru's personality cult and the associated statism, i.e., the overarching faith in the state and the leadership. However, Nehru himself actively discouraged the creation of a cult of personality around him. He wrote an essay titled 'Rashtrapati' in 1937 published in the Modern Review warning people about dictatorship and emphasizing the value of questioning leaders.After Nehru, the Congress party has been accused of promoting a personality cult centered his daughter Indira Gandhi, and the Nehru-Gandhi family.

Indira Gandhi has also been described as having a cult of personality during her administration. Following India's victory in the 1971 Indo-Pak war, Gandhi was hailed by many as a manifestation of the Hindu goddess Durga. In that year, Gandhi nominated herself for the Bharat Ratna, the highest civilian award in the country. During the Emergency period, the then Congress party president, Devakanta Barooah, had remarked, India is Indira, Indira is India. Her assassination in 1984 by her Sikh bodyguards sparked a massive wave of public grief and anti-Sikh violence. The Congress party, led by her son Rajiv Gandhi, utilized her death to win the general elections held shortly after. His assassination while campaigning in the 1991 general elections also led to widespread public grief, which was utilized by the Congress to win the elections despite unfavorable circumstances.

Current Indian Prime Minister Narendra Modi is often criticized for creating a personality cult around himself. Despite some setbacks and criticism, Modi's charisma and popularity were key factors that helped the Bharatiya Janata Party (BJP) return to power in the 2019 general elections. Shivraj Singh Chouhan, the chief minister of the country's second largest state, said in 2022, "He is superhuman and has traces of God in him." The opposition often accused Modi of spreading propaganda using popular media such as movies, television and web series. Modi is often accused of having narcissistic traits. In 2015, Modi wore a suit that has his name embroidered all over it in fine letters like a Hindu namavali (A sheet of cloth printed all over with the names of Hindu gods and goddesses usually worn by Hindu priests during puja) while greeting US president Barack Obama during his bilateral visit to India. This suit was auctioned that year, selling at a record amount of 43.1 million Indian rupees, thereby earning the Guinness World Record for the most expensive suit. In 2019, a biographical film of Modi was released, which was heavily criticized for its hagiographical nature. In 2021, Modi named the world's largest cricket stadium after himself. During the 2024 general elections, Modi tried to divinize himself in an interview in which he stated that he viewed himself to be sent directly by God to serve a special purpose on Earth. BJP spokesperson Sambit Patra while campaigning in the Hindu holy city of Puri stated that even Jagannath (the form of the Hindu god Vishnu that is venerated there) worships Modi.

The BJP is also stated to have created a cult of personality around Hindu Mahasabha leader V. D. Savarkar and Gandhi's assassin Nathuram Godse to oppose the dominance of Gandhian philosophy in Indian society. In addition to Modi, Yogi Adityanath is also described as having built a cult-like following among Hindutva fundamentalists. An attempt has been made in the internet to link Modi & Yogi with a series of 16th century apocalyptic prophecies by the medieval Vaishnava saint Achyutananda Dasa, which supposedly herald the expulsion of Indian Muslims and arrival of Kalki in a manner similar to how Donald Trump has been linked with the Rapture and the Second Coming of Christ in certain circles of American evangelicalism.

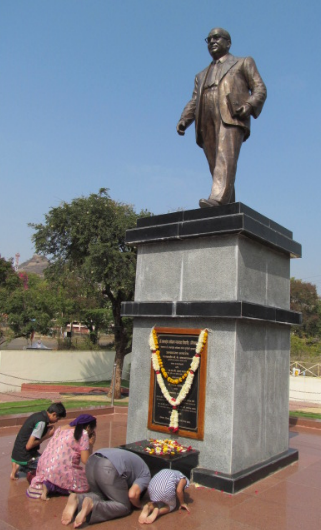
Citizens of India bow to the statues of B. R. Ambedkar in 2014.

One study claims that India's political culture since the decline of the Congress-centric dominant-party system in India from the 1990s onwards as a fallout of the Ram Janmabhoomi movement and Mandal Commission protests has paved the way for personality cults centered around leaders of the small regional parties, derived from hero-worship of sportspersons and film industry celebrities and the concept of bhakti, which in turn has fostered nepotism, cronyism and sycophancy. Among these leaders, Tamil Nadu Chief Minister J. Jayalalitha had one of the most extensive ones.

Jayalalitha was widely venerated by the leaders and members of her party as Amma ('mother' in Tamil, also used to refer to Hindu goddesses), and they would prostrate themselves before her. She would be regularly publicly applauded with Tamil titles like Makkalin Mudhalvar (people's chief minister), Puratchi Thalaivi (revolutionary female leader), Thanga Thalaivi (golden female leader), etc. by her cadres. Her government provided various kinds of subsidized goods under the brand name of Amma. Widespread violence broke out throughout the state when she was arrested on charges of corruption. A huge wave of public grief swept all over the state, with some even committing suicide, following her death in 2016.

Another leader, Mayawati, was also known for attempting to foster a cult of personality during her tenure as the Chief Minister of India's most populous state by getting constructed large statues of herself and the elephant (which was the electoral symbol of her party) that were installed in public parks at the cost of the government exchequer.

Historical personalities are also deified to the level of cult worship long after their lifetimes, which is utilized by politicians to woo their followers for electoral purposes. Prominent examples are the cult of Shivaji in Maharashtra and the cult of Dr. B. R. Ambedkar among Dalits. In case of Ambedkar, his cult of personality is largely institutionalised through his interpretation of Buddhism called Navayana where he is venerated as a bodhisattva, a stance not shared with other Buddhist denominations.

=== Iraq ===
As a sign of his consolidation of power as Iraq's dictator, Saddam Hussein's personality cult pervaded Iraqi society. He had thousands of portraits, posters, statues and murals erected in his honor all over Iraq. His face could be seen on the sides of office buildings, schools and classrooms, airports, and shops, as well as on all denominations of Iraqi currency (the dinar).

Saddam's personality cult reflected his efforts to appeal to the various elements in Iraqi society. This was seen in his variety of apparel: he appeared in the costumes of the Bedouin, the traditional clothes of the Iraqi peasant (which he essentially wore during his childhood), and even appeared in Kurdish clothing, but he also appeared in Western suits fitted by his favorite tailor, projecting the image of an urbane and modern leader. Sometimes he would also be portrayed as a devout Muslim, wearing a full headdress and robe, praying towards Mecca, but most often he was depicted wearing a military uniform.

=== Israel ===
Critics of Benjamin Netanyahu, the current and longest-serving prime minister of Israel and leader of the opposition when not in power, and some observers have described him as enjoying a personality cult. A study claims that Netanyahu has created popularity and maintained power by setting a narrative in which Iran was acquiring the capacity to annihilate Israel and "wreak havoc upon the Western world" and in which the Jews are again threatened by an antisemitic regime unless Israel leads a preventative response, while constructing a cult of personality and promising security to all Israelis, and thus, solidifying his support through an "orchestrated unity," which includes the ritual of the leader offering security in return for the people's exchange of gratitude.

Isabel Kershner writes that Netanyahu's "most loyal base" "had built something of a personality cult around him," while the two main political blocks of Israel center on his personality and can be described as "Only Bibi" and "Anyone but Bibi." Critics who accused Netanyahu of a personality cult include the opinion journalists Gershon Baskin and Pamela Peled of The Jerusalem Post.

=== Italy ===
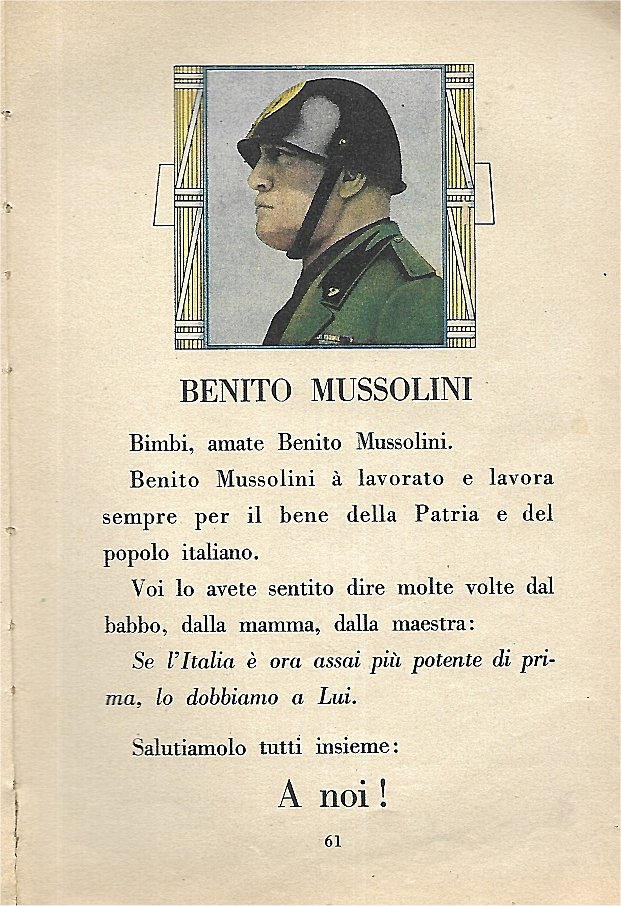
"Kids, you have to love Benito Mussolini. He always works for the good of the Fatherland and the Italian people. You have heard this many times, from your dad, mom, or teacher: If Italy is now far more powerful than before, we owe it to Him." (1936 first-grade textbook)

Benito Mussolini was portrayed as the embodiment of Italian Fascism, and as a result, he was keen to be seen as such. Mussolini was styled by other Italian fascists as Il Duce ("The Leader"). Since Mussolini was represented as an almost omniscient leader, a common saying in Italy during Mussolini's rule was "The Duce is always right" (Italian: Il Duce ha sempre ragione). Mussolini became a unifying force in Italy in order for ordinary Italians to put their differences to one side with local officials. The personality cult surrounding Mussolini became a way for him to justify his personal rule, and it acted as a way to enable social and political integration.

Mussolini's military service in World War I and survival of failed assassination attempts were used to convey a mysterious aura around him. Fascist propaganda stated that Mussolini's body had been pierced by shrapnel just like St. Sebastian had been pierced by arrows, the difference being that Mussolini had survived this ordeal. Mussolini was also compared to St. Francis of Assisi, who, like Mussolini, "suffered and sacrificed himself for others."

The press was given instructions on what to write and what not to write about Mussolini. Mussolini himself authorized which photographs of him were allowed to be published and rejected any photographs that made him appear weak or less prominent than he wanted to be portrayed as in a particular group.

Italy's war against Ethiopia (1935–37) was portrayed in propaganda as a revival of the Roman Empire, with Mussolini as the first Roman emperor Augustus. To improve his own image, as well as the image of Fascism in the Arab world, Mussolini declared himself to be the "Protector of Islam" during an official visit to Libya in 1937.

=== Germany ===
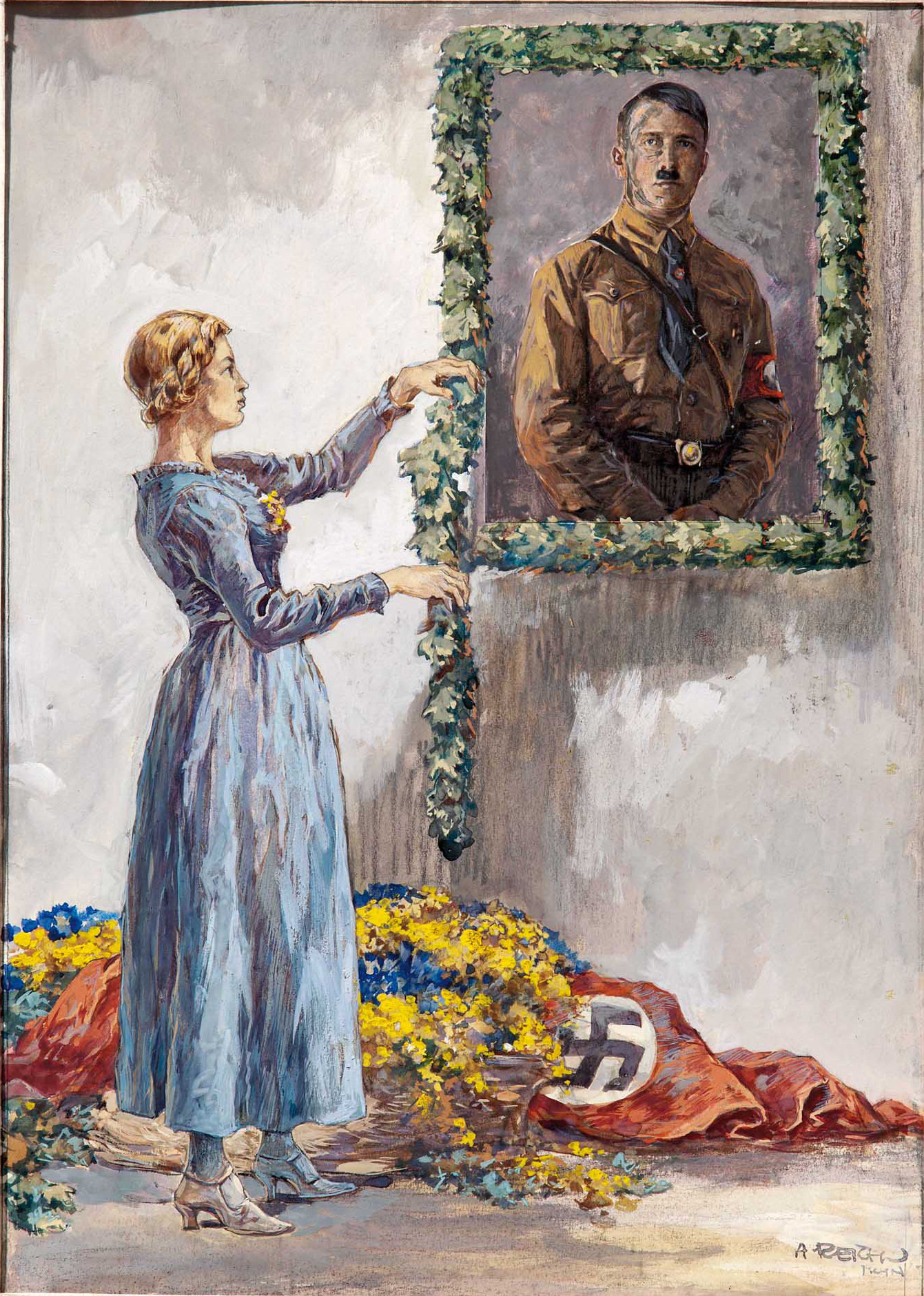
A portrait of Hitler by Albert Reich (1881–1942)

Starting in the 1920s, during the early years of the Nazi Party, Nazi propaganda began to depict the Nazi leader Adolf Hitler as a demagogue figure who was the almighty defender and savior of Germany. After the end of World War I (1918) and the Treaty of Versailles (1919), the German people experienced turmoil under the Weimar Republic, and, according to Nazi propaganda, only Hitler could save them and restore Germany's greatness, which in turn gave rise to the "Führer-cult."

During the five election campaigns in 1932, the Nazi newspaper Völkischer Beobachter portrayed Hitler as a man who had a mass movement united behind him, a man with one mission — to solely save Germany as the 'Leader of the coming Germany'. The Night of the Long Knives in 1934—after which Hitler referred to himself as being single-handedly "responsible for the fate of the German people"—also helped to reinforce the myth that Hitler was the sole protector of the Volksgemeinschaft, the ethnic community of the German people.

Nazi Propaganda Minister Joseph Goebbels cultivated an image of Hitler as a "heroic genius". The myth also gave rise to the saying and concept, "If only the Führer knew." Germans thought that problems that they ascribed to the Nazi hierarchy would not have occurred if Hitler had been aware of the situation; thus, Nazi bigwigs were blamed, and Hitler escaped criticism. British historian Ian Kershaw published his book The "Hitler Myth": Image and Reality in the Third Reich in 1987 and wrote:

Hitler stood for at least some things they [German people] admired, and for many had become the symbol and embodiment of the national revival which the Third Reich had in many respects been perceived to accomplish.

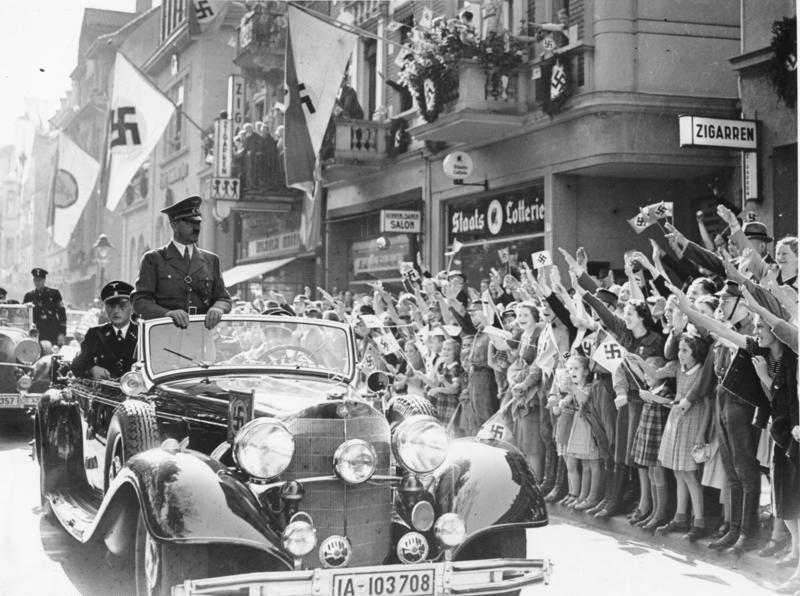
Adolf Hitler in Bad Godesberg, Germany, 1938

During the early 1930s, the myth was given credence due to Hitler's perceived ability to revive the German economy during the Great Depression. However, Albert Speer wrote that by 1939, the myth was under threat, and the Nazis had to organize cheering crowds to turn up to events. Speer wrote:

The shift in the mood of the population, the drooping morale which began to be felt throughout Germany in 1939, was evident in the necessity to organize cheering crowds where two years earlier Hitler had been able to count on spontaneity. What is more, he himself had meanwhile moved away from the admiring masses. He tended to be angry and impatient more often than in the past when, as still occasionally happened, a crowd on Wilhelmsplatz began clamoring for him to appear. Two years before he had often stepped out on the "historic balcony." Now he sometimes snapped at his adjutants when they came to him with the request that he show himself: "Stop bothering me with that!"

The myth helped to unite the German people during World War II, especially against the Soviet Union and the Western Allies. During Hitler's early victories against Poland and Western Europe, the myth was at its peak, but when it became obvious to most Germans that the war was lost, then the myth was exposed and Hitler's popularity declined. A report is given in the little Bavarian town of Markt Schellenberg on March 11, 1945:

When the leader of the Wehrmacht unit at the end of his speech called for a Sieg Heil for the Führer, it was returned neither by the Wehrmacht present, nor by the Volkssturm, nor by the spectators of the civilian population who had turned up. This silence of the masses ... probably reflects better than anything else, the attitudes of the population.

=== North Korea ===
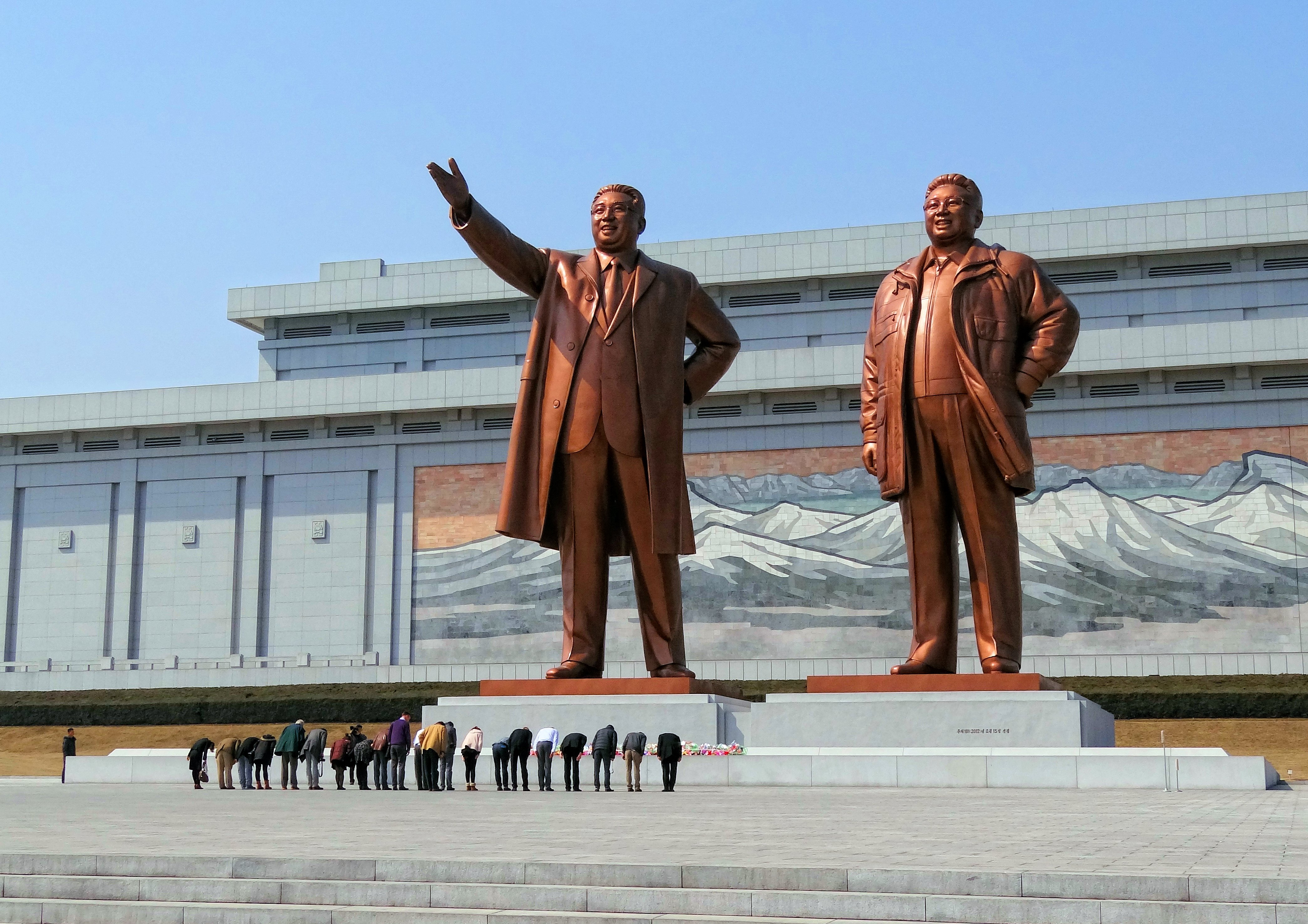
Citizens of North Korea bow to statues of Kim Il Sung and Kim Jong Il in 2014

The cult of personality which surrounds North Korea's ruling family, the Kim family, has existed for decades and it can be found in many aspects of North Korean culture. Although not acknowledged by the North Korean government, many defectors and Western visitors state there are often stiff penalties for those who criticize or do not show "proper" respect for the regime. The personality cult began soon after Kim Il Sung took power in 1948, and was greatly expanded after his death in 1994.

The pervasiveness and the extreme nature of North Korea's personality cult surpasses those of Joseph Stalin and Mao Zedong. The cult is also marked by the intensity of the people's feelings for and devotion to their leaders, and the key role played by a Confucianized ideology of familism both in maintaining the cult and thereby in sustaining the regime itself. The North Korean cult of personality is a large part of Juche and totalitarianism.

Yakov Novichenko, a Soviet military officer who saved Kim Il Sung's life on 1 May 1946, is reported to also have developed a cult of personality around 1984. He is considered the only non-Korean to have developed a cult of personality there.

=== Philippines ===
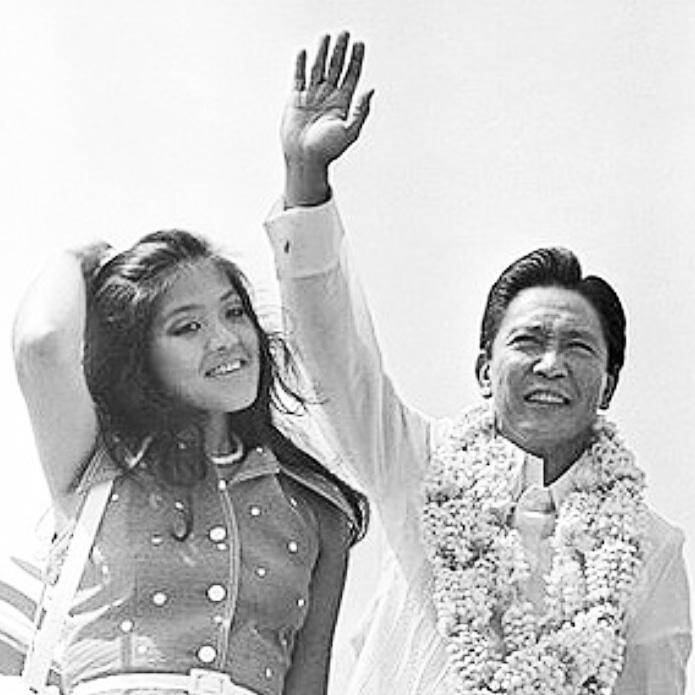
Ferdinand Marcos (pictured with his daughter Imee) was a Philippine dictator and kleptocrat. His regime was infamous for its corruption.

Ferdinand Marcos developed a cult of personality in order to stay in power for 20 years as president of the Philippines, a dictatorship marked by political corruption and human rights violations. His administration’s personalist ideology and policies, combining veneration and idolization of Marcos himself with extreme populism and ultranationalism, have been compared to those of other totalitarian and authoritarian leaders such as Joseph Stalin and Adolf Hitler, as well as to those of more recent dictators and autocrats such as Suharto in Indonesia, Saddam Hussein in Iraq, and North Korea’s Kim dynasty.

The propaganda techniques used, either by himself or by others, to mythologize Ferdinand Marcos began with local political machinations in Ilocos Norte while Ferdinand was still the young son of politician and Japanese collaborator Mariano Marcos and persist today in the efforts to revise the way Marcos is portrayed in Philippine history. According to members of his administration, such as Adrian Cristobal, Marcos's intent was to project an image of himself as "the only patron, the king" of Philippine society, which he still saw as a society of tribes." Cristobal furthers that "Marcos and the First Lady wanted more than anything else [...] to be king and queen. They wished to shape the kingdom in their own image; [...] Marcos wanted to be able to say, 'L'État, c'est moi.'" In some extreme cases where Marcos encouraged the formation of cults so that they could serve as a political weapon, Marcos came to be thought of as a God.

These propaganda narratives and techniques include: using red scare tactics such as red-tagging to portray activists as communists and to exaggerate the threat represented by the Communist Party of the Philippines; using martial law to take control of mass media and silence criticism; the use of foreign-funded government development projects and construction projects as propaganda tools; creating an entire propaganda framework around a "new society" in which he would rule under a system of "constitutional authoritarianism"; the perpetuation of hagiographical books and films; the perpetuation of propaganda narratives about Marcos's activities during World War II, which have since been proven false by historical documents; the creation of myths and stories around himself and his family; and portrayals of himself in coinage and even a Mount Rushmore-type monument; among others."

Since Ferdinand Marcos's death, propaganda efforts have been made to whitewash his place in Philippine history, an act of historical negationism commonly referred to using the more popular term "historical revisionism."

=== Russia ===
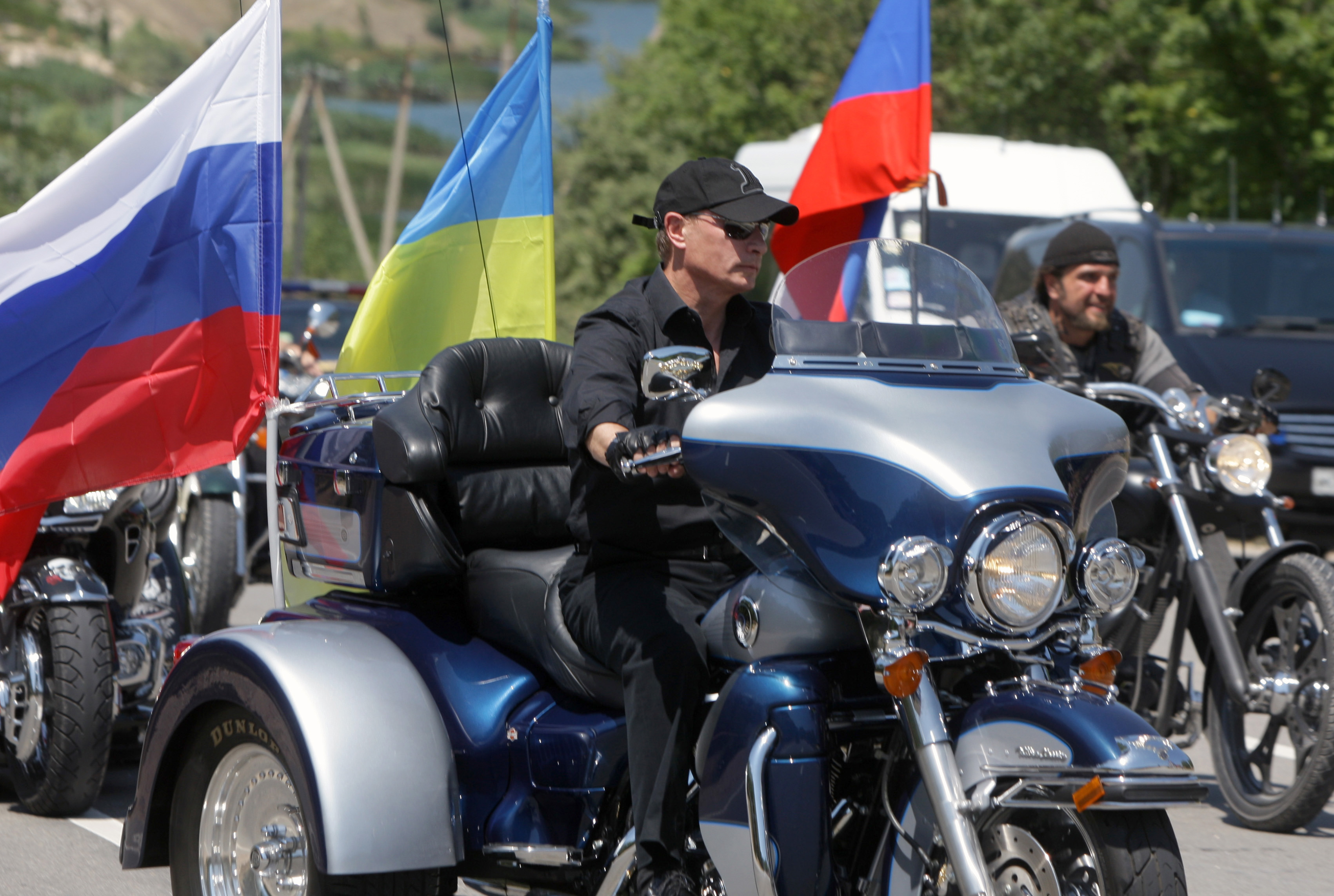
Vladimir Putin on a Harley-Davidson tricycle with a Russian biker gang on a visit to Ukraine in 2010

Russian president Vladimir Putin has deliberately cultivated a public image centered on physical toughness and personal prowess. State media frequently showcase highly choreographed appearances involving outdoor activities, athletic demonstrations, and interactions with wildlife. Analysts note that these displays function as a strategic effort to reinforce a strongman persona and maintain political control, reflecting a reliance on image‑management rather than transparent governance.

=== Soviet Union ===
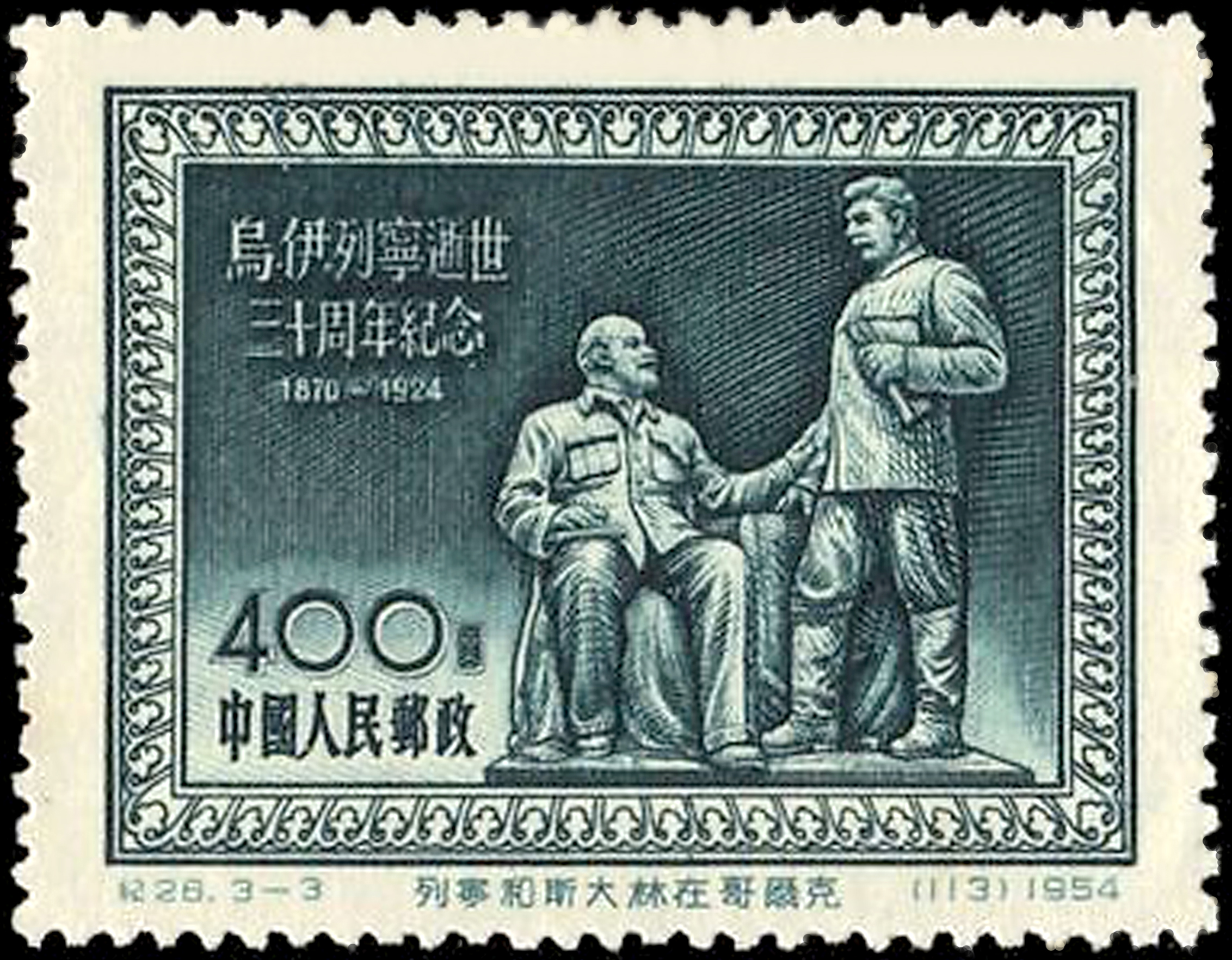
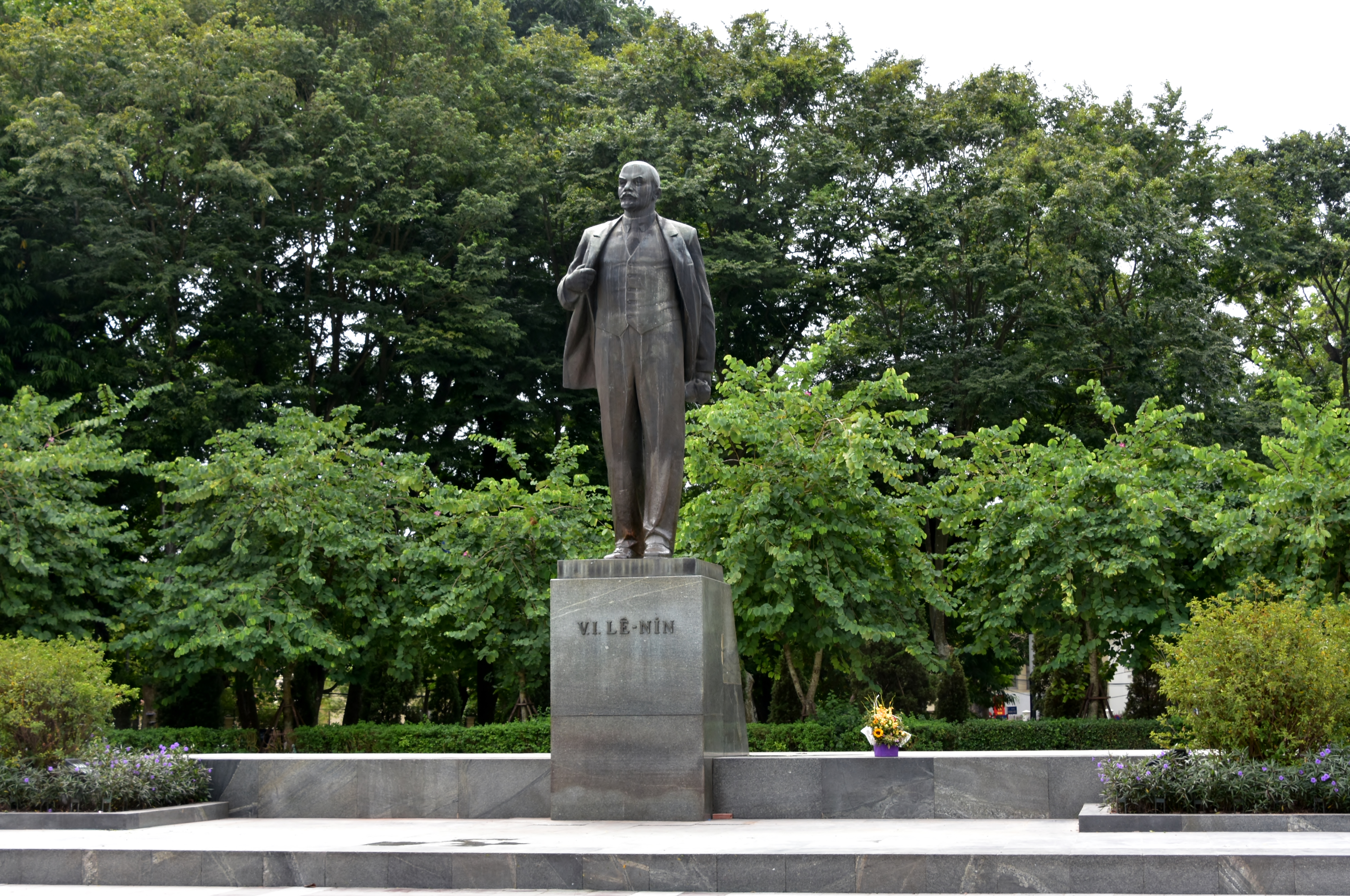
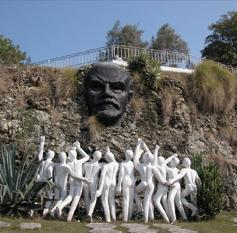
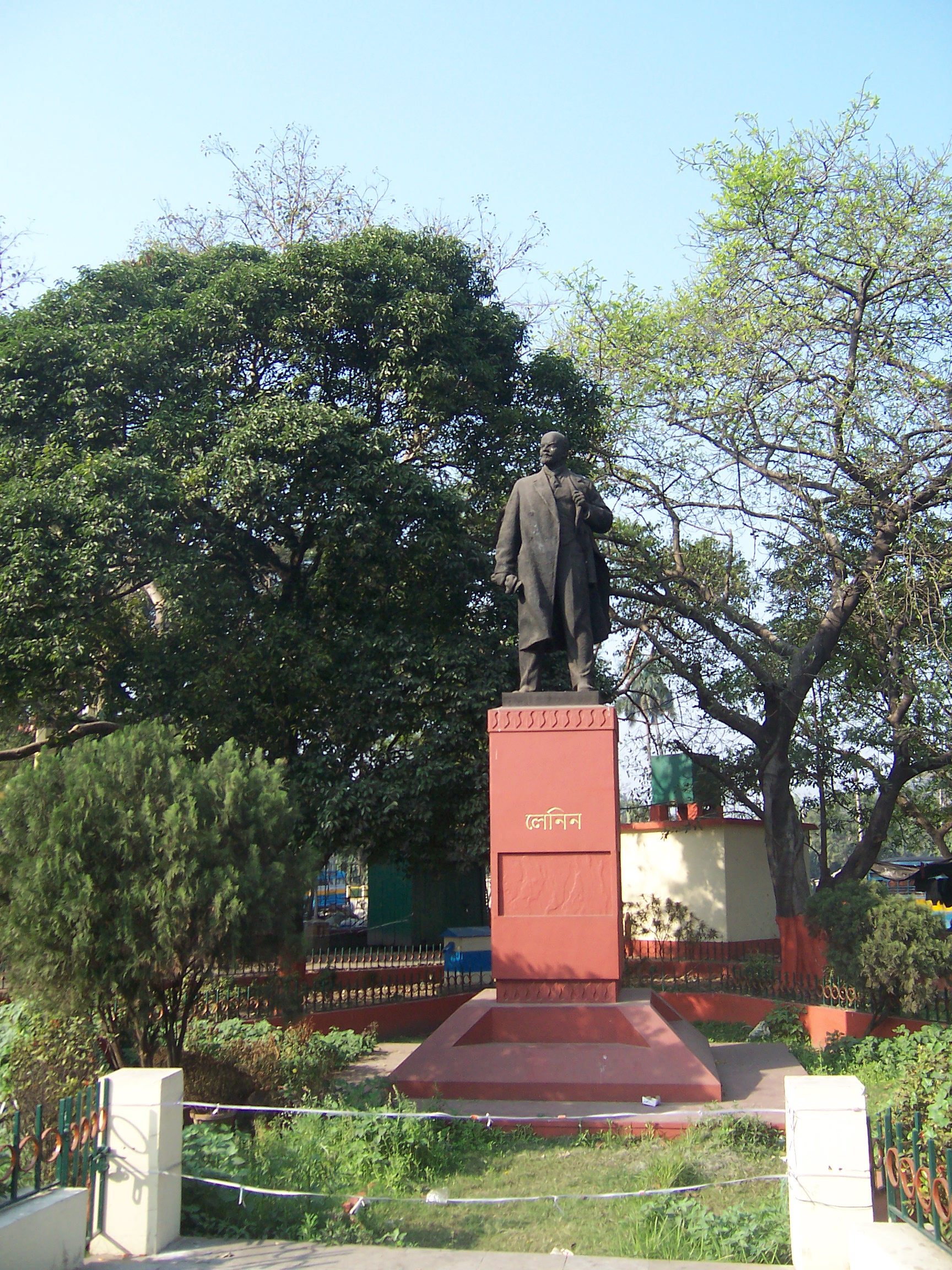
Vladimir Lenin's cult of personality is part & parcel of Communist-ruled states. From left to right are – 1) Chinese stamp issued in 1954 by the PRC commemorating a sculpture of Lenin & Stalin created by Soviet sculptors Veniamin Pinchuk & Robert Taurit unveiled in 1949 at Gorky, 2) statue of Lenin at a public park in Hanoi, 3) a monument dedicated to Lenin in Havana & 4) statue of Lenin in Kolkata installed in 1970 by the CPI(M), an alliance member of the then state government and would later form the world's longest ruling democratically elected Communist government.

The first cult of personality to take shape in the USSR was that of Vladimir Lenin. Up until the dissolution of the USSR in 1991, Lenin's portrait and quotes were a ubiquitous part of the culture. However, during his lifetime, Lenin vehemently denounced any effort to build a cult of personality, as (in his eyes) the cult of personality was antithetical to Marxism. Despite this, members of the Communist Party used Lenin's image as the all-knowing revolutionary who would liberate the proletariat. Lenin attempted to take action against this; however, it was halted after Lenin was nearly assassinated in August 1918.

His health would only further decline as he suffered numerous severe strokes, with the worst in May 1922 and March 1923. In this state Lenin would lose the ability to walk and speak. During this time the Bolshevik Party began to promote the accomplishments of Lenin as the basis for a cult of personality, using him as an image of morality and of revolutionary ideas.

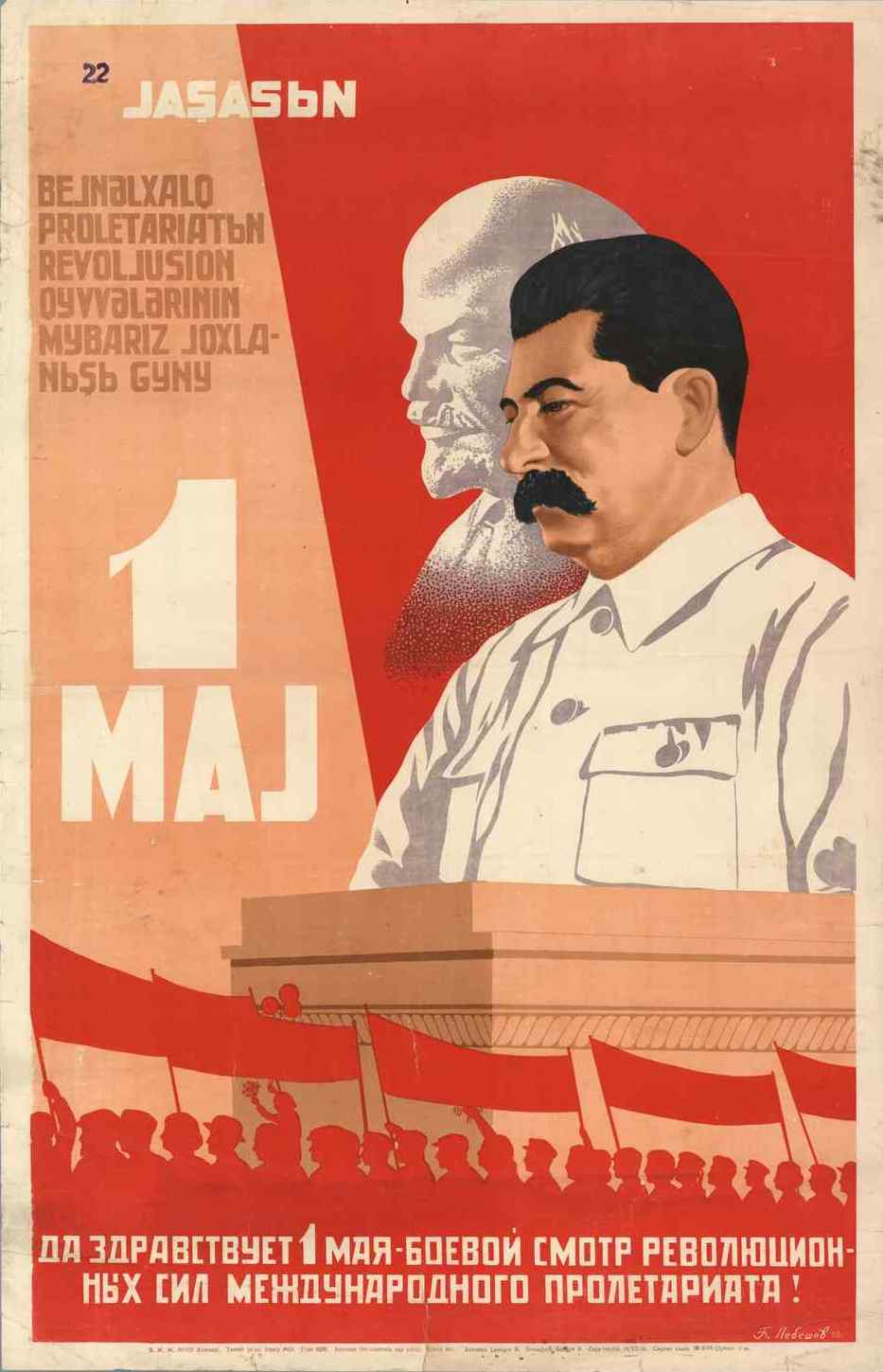
Propaganda poster of Lenin and Stalin

After Vladimir Lenin's death in 1924 and the exile of Leon Trotsky in 1928, Joseph Stalin came to embody the Soviet Union. Once Lenin's cult of personality had grown, creating enough influence, Stalin integrated Lenin's ideals into his own cult. Unlike other cults of personalities, the Lenin and Stalin cults were not created to give the leaders power; they were created to give power and validation to the Communist Party. Stalin initially spoke out against the cult and other outrageous and false claims centered around him. However, Stalin's attitude began to shift in favor of the cult in the 1930s, and he began to encourage it following the Great Purge of 1936 to 1938.

Seldom did Stalin object to state actions that furthered his cult of personality; however, he did oppose some initiatives from Soviet propagandists. When Nikolai Yezhov proposed to rename Moscow to Stalinodar, which translates as "gift of Stalin," Stalin objected. To merge the Lenin and Stalin cults together, Stalin changed aspects of Lenin's life in the public's eye in order to place himself in power. This kept the two cults in a line that showed that both Lenin and Stalin had the same ideas and that Stalin was the rightful successor of Lenin, leading the USSR in the fashion Lenin would have done.

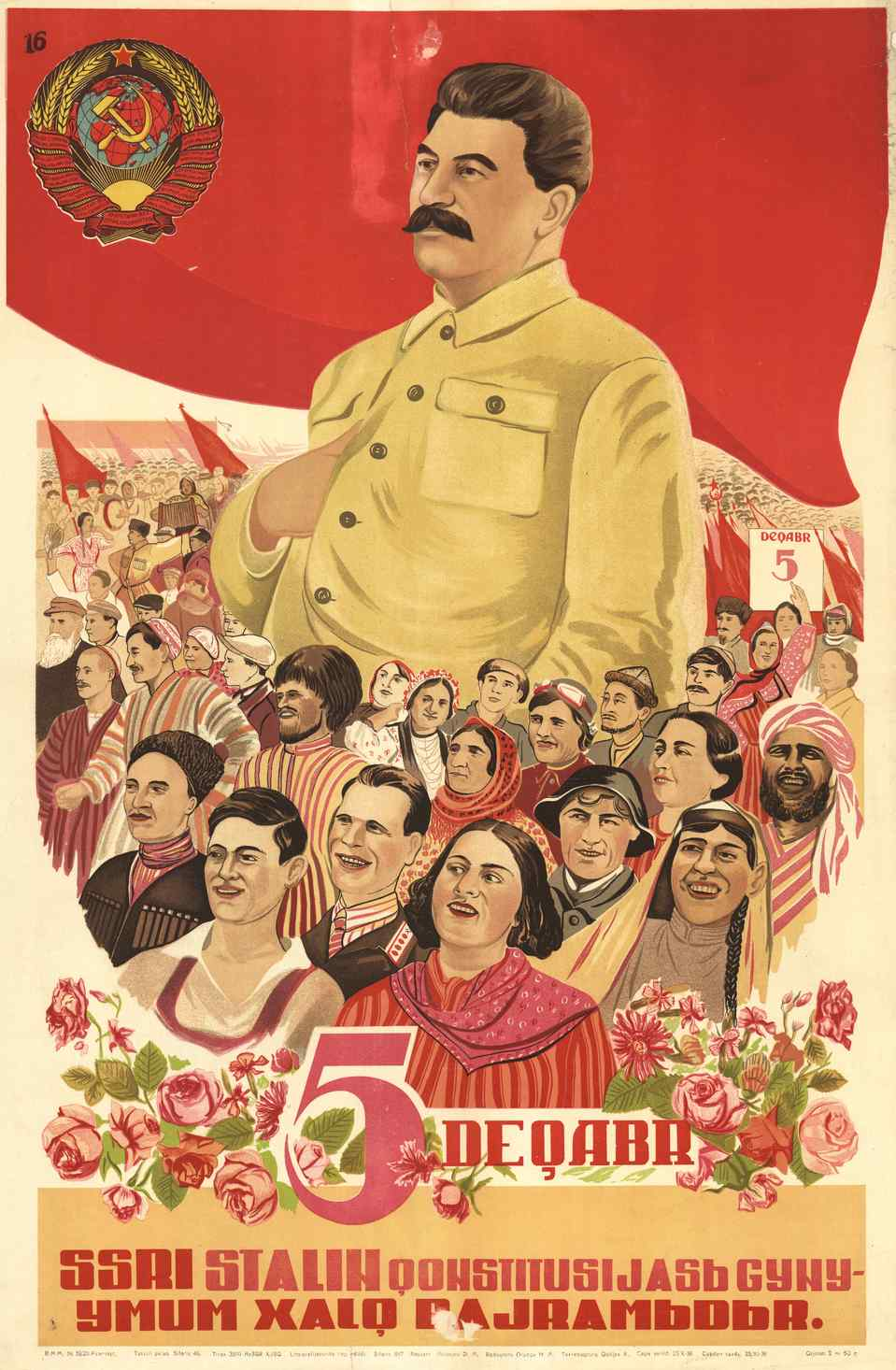
Soviet poster in the Azerbaijani language featuring Stalin, 1938

In December 1929, Stalin celebrated his 50th birthday, which featured prominently in the Soviet press. The media used positive adjectives like "great," "beloved," "bold," "wise," "inspirer," and "genius" to describe him. Similarly, speeches that were given by people to the peasants described Stalin as "Our Best Collective Farm Worker," "Our Shockworker, Our Best of Best," and "Our Darling, Our Guiding Star." By 1934, under Stalin's full control of the country, socialist realism became the endorsed method of art and literature. Even under the communist regime, the Stalin cult of personality portrayed Stalin's leadership as patriarchy under the features laid out during Khrushchev's 1956 speech. After 1936, the Soviet press described Stalin as the "Father of Nations."

Historian Kevin Morgan identifies a third period of cult-building during the time of Stalin's reign, following construction of the Lenin cult and the Stalin cult of the 1930s. Following a "relative hiatus of activity during the war years," Morgan observes, a third phase erupted coinciding with the Cold War, "attaining its climax with the commemoration of Stalin's seventieth birthday in December 1949." This post-war personality cult was paralleled by similar leader cults in the newly communist nations of central and eastern Europe, Morgan notes, including cults dedicated to Georgy Dimitrov in Bulgaria and Ernst Thälmann in East Germany.

One key element of Soviet propaganda was interaction between Stalin and the children of the Soviet Union. He was often photographed with children of different ethnic backgrounds of the Soviet Union and was often photographed giving gifts to children. In 1935 the phrase, "Thank You, Dear Comrade Stalin, for a Happy Childhood!" started to appear above doorways at nurseries, orphanages, and schools; children also chanted this slogan at festivals.

Another key element of Soviet propaganda was imagery of Stalin and Lenin. In many posters, Stalin and Lenin were placed together to show their camaraderie and that their ideals were one. Throughout the 1930s, posters with both images were used as a way to bring the nation and the military together under the policies of the Communist Party during World War II, with the idea of Lenin as the father of the revolutionary ideas and Stalin as the disciple who would fulfill the communist ideals. Stalin was also portrayed in numerous films produced by Mosfilm, which remained a Soviet-led company until the fall of the Soviet Union.

=== Spain ===
Following the outbreak of the Spanish Civil War in 1936, Francisco Franco's image was deliberately crafted through extensive nationalist propaganda that portrayed him as a messianic figure and savior of traditional Spanish values against republican and communist forces preventing Spain from becoming a Soviet puppet. The carefully constructed narrative emphasized his military prowess and Catholic piety, with state-controlled media consistently depicting him as "El Caudillo" (The Leader), a divinely appointed guardian of Spain's cultural and religious heritage.

=== Syria ===
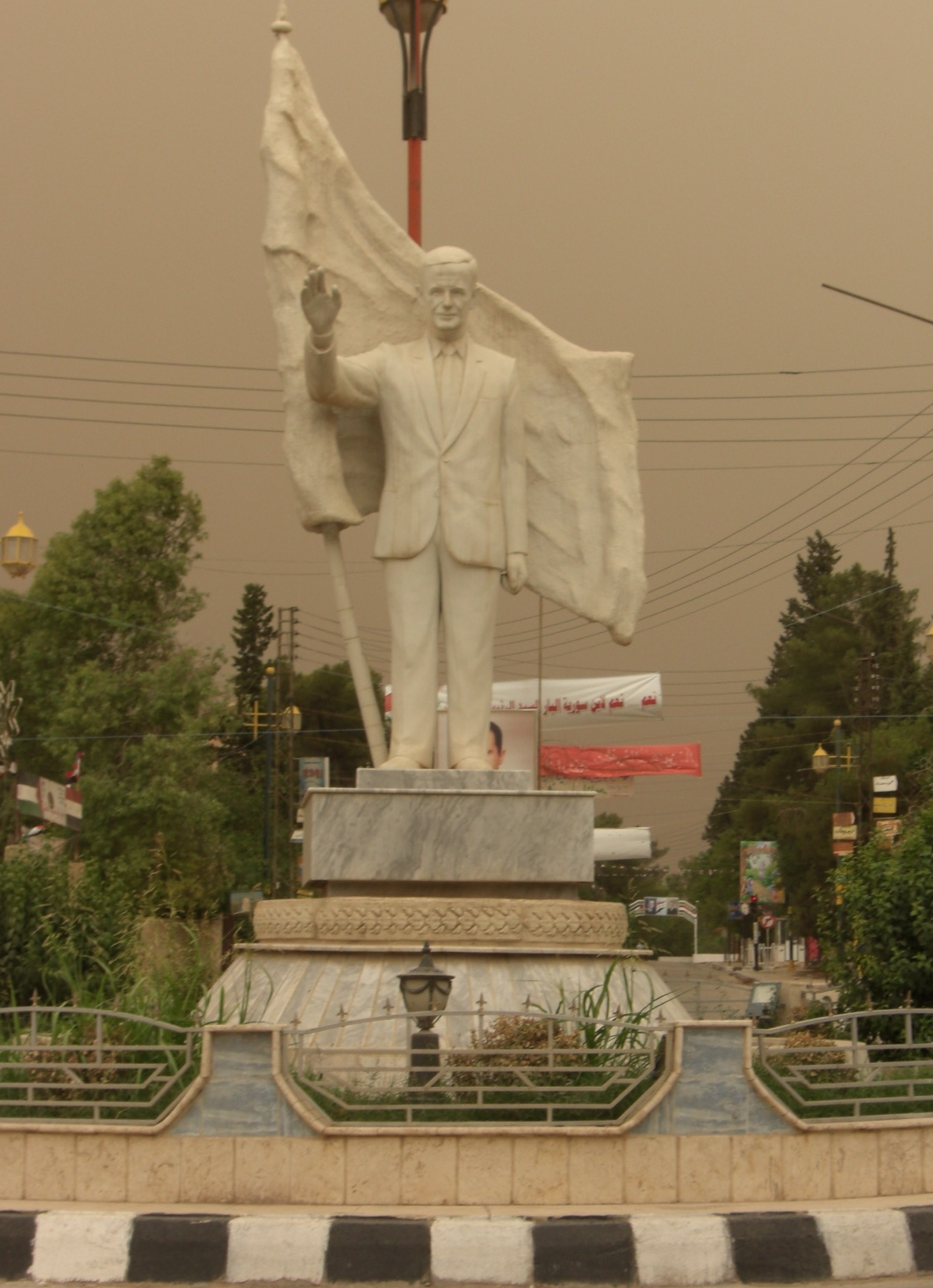
Statue of Syrian dictator Hafez al-Assad, who is revered as their Al-Abad (Immortal Leader) by followers of Syrian Ba'athism

Syria's Hafez al-Assad, a Ba'athist officer who seized power through a coup d'état in 1970, established a pervasive cult of personality to maintain his dictatorship. As soon as he took over power, Ba'ath party loyalists designated him as "Al-Abad"; an Arabic terminology with deep religious dimensions. Linguistically, ''Al-Abad'' means "forever, infinite and immortality," and religious clerics use this term in relation to Divine Attributes. By designating Assad as "Al-Abad," the Syrian Ba'ath Movement ideologically elevated Hafez al-Assad as its "Immortal", "god-like figure" who is supposed to represent the state as well as the Syrian nation itself.

Another meaning of Al-Abad is "permanent," which is used in state propaganda to denote the perpetual status quo of an "eternal political order" created by Hafez al-Assad, who continues to embody Assadist ideology. The term's verbal form "Abada" means "to commit genocide", including the "symbolical, performative side of violence." This dimension was weaponized by the Assad regime to monopolize violence against alleged dissidents and justify state terrorism, including genocidal acts of mass murder like the Hama Massacre, Qamishli Massacre and other massacres of the Syrian civil war.

Arab Socialist Ba'ath party initially manufactured Hafez al-Assad's cult of Arab socialist heroism in consultancy with Soviet state propagandists, mimicking the pervasive personality cults prevalent across Soviet Bloc dictatorships like Romania and North Korea. Beginning as a tool to bind every Syrian citizen with the obligation of undying loyalty (bay'ah) to Assad in the 1970s, the propaganda was further intensified, and personalist depictions reached new heights during the 1980s. The state began rewriting Syrian history itself, with the Ba'ath party deifying Hafez al-Assad as their "leader for eternity" ["qa'iduna ila l-abad"] and portraying him as "the second Saladin" who guarantees Arab peoples victory over Zionist Crusaders.

Through kindergarten, school books, educational institutions and Baathist media; Assadist propaganda constructed the image of a homogenous Arab nation protected by a fatherly leader revelling under the "cult of Saladin." The Assad regime venerated Hafez al-Assad's personalist iconography perpetually in the public and private spheres of everyday Syrian life through monuments, images, murals, posters, statues, stamps, Ba'athist symbolism, currency notes, photos, banners, state TV, etc. More than a leader of the masses, Ba'athist propaganda equated Hafez al-Assad himself with "the people," apart from declaring him as the "father of the nation" and as an exceptional human being, assigning him multiple roles as a doctor, soldier, lawyer, educator, statesman, general, etc. Every civil society organization, trade union and any form of cultural or religious association in

Syria is obliged to declare their "binding covenant" to Hafez al-Assad and display his iconography in order to be legalized. The far-reaching personality cult of his father has been weaponized by Bashar al-Assad as a pillar of his regime's legitimacy and also as a supplement to enhance his own personality cult. Bashar's cult downplayed religious elements for technocratic Arab socialist themes, with a constant militaristic emphasis on conspiratorial threats from forces of Zionism due to an allegedly ongoing "dormant war with Israel".

One utilization of the personality cult had been to enable the Assad dynasty to downplay the rural Alawite origins of their family from public eyes. Images of Assad family members were installed across Syria's numerous heritage sites and monuments to wed the dynasty with Ba'athist Syrian history. Murals and statues of Hafez al-Assad and Bashar al-Assad were constructed across Syrian cities, towns, villages, etc., depicting them in the costumes of medieval Bedouins or as sultans like Harun al-Rashid. Assadist cult of personality functioned as a psychological tool for the totalitarian regime, which attempted to claim to the Syrian society that the Ba'athist system shall continue ruling eternally.

After the fall of the Assad regime in December 2024, Syria’s Constitutional Declaration in March 2025 criminalized public support for the former Assad regime.

=== Turkey ===
==== Republicans ====
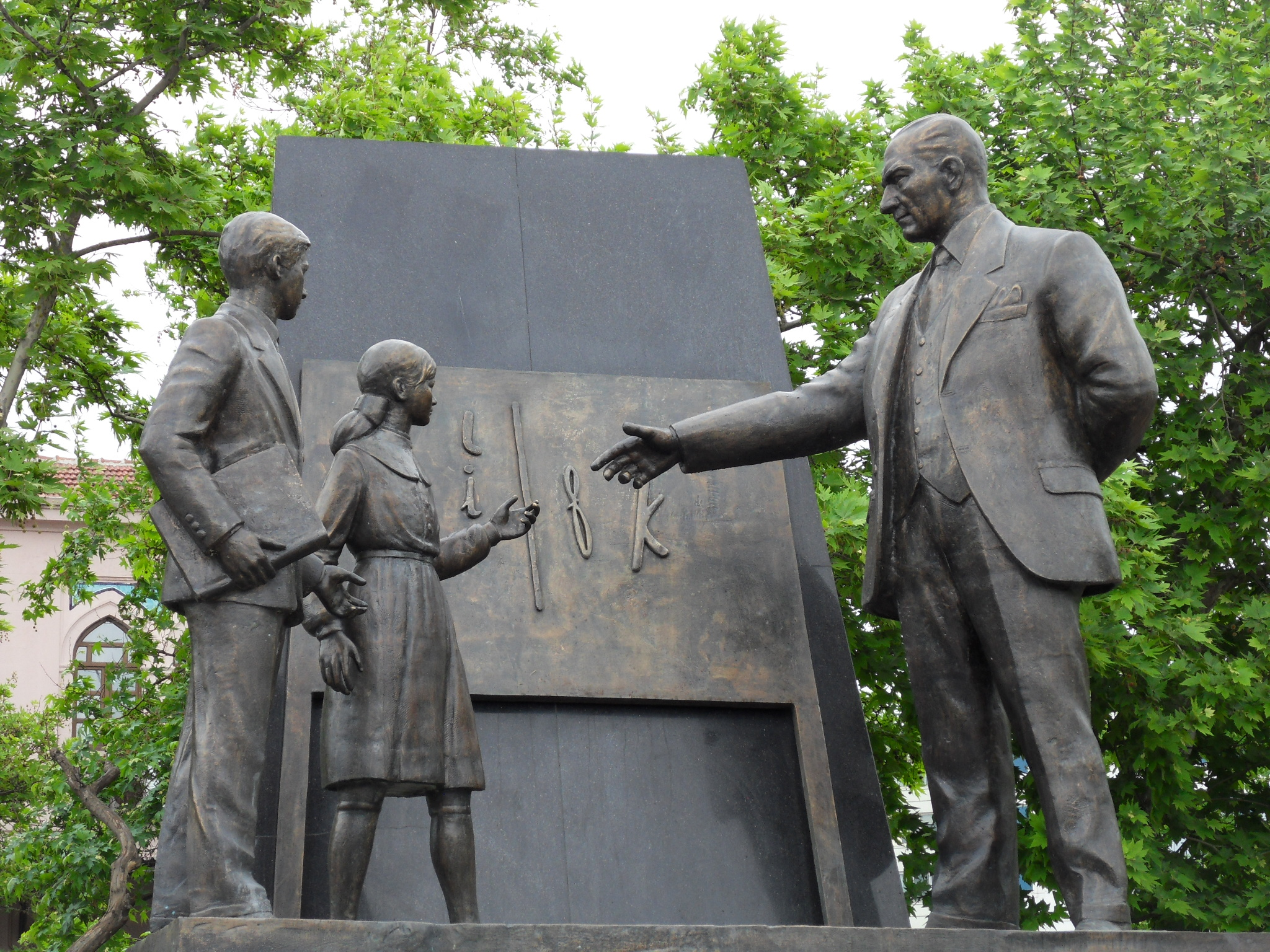
Monument to Atatürk in Kadıköy, Istanbul

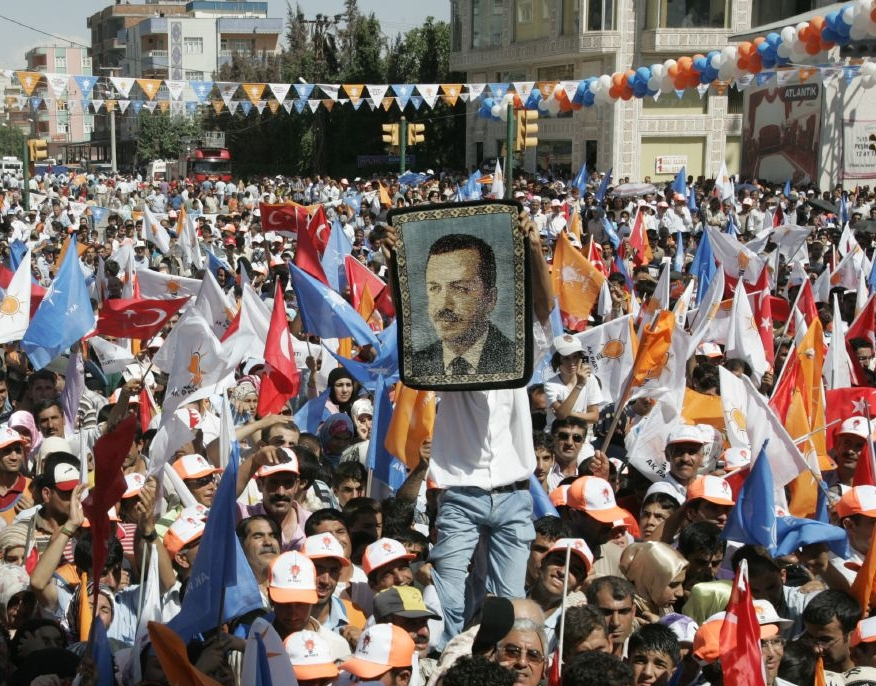
A wall rug of Erdoğan at a rally of his party

In Turkey, founder of the Turkish Republic Mustafa Kemal Atatürk is commemorated by a myriad of memorials throughout the country, such as the Atatürk International Airport in Istanbul, the Atatürk Bridge over the Golden Horn (Haliç), the Atatürk Dam, and Atatürk Stadium. His titles include Great Leader (Ulu Önder), Eternal Commander (Ebedî Başkomutan), Head Teacher (Başöğretmen), and Eternal Chief (Ebedî Şef). Atatürk statues have been erected in all Turkish cities by the Turkish Government, and most towns have their own memorial to him. His face and name are seen and heard everywhere in Turkey; his portrait can be seen in all public buildings, in all schools and classrooms, on all school textbooks, on all Turkish lira banknotes, and in the homes of many Turkish families.

At the exact time of Atatürk's death, on every November 10, at 09:05, most vehicles and people in the country's streets pause for one minute in remembrance. In 1951, the Turkish Parliament issued a law (5816) outlawing insults to his reminiscence (Turkish: hatırasına alenen hakaret) or destruction of objects representing him, which is still in force. There is a government website that is aimed at denouncing different kinds of crimes found on the internet, including the 8th element crimes committed against Atatürk (Turkish: Atatürk aleyhine işlenen suçlar). The Turkish government as of 2025 has filters in place to block websites deemed to contain materials insulting to his memory.

The start of Atatürk's cult of personality is placed in the 1920s, when the first statues started being built. The idea of Atatürk as the "father of the Turks" is ingrained in Turkish politics, and politicians in that country are evaluated in relation to his cult of personality. The persistence of the phenomenon of Atatürk's personality cult has become an area of deep interest to scholars. Atatürk impersonators are also seen around Turkey much after Atatürk's death to preserve what is called the "world's longest-running personality cult."

==== Monarchists ====
Ottoman sultans Mehmed the Conqueror and Abdul Hamid II have cults of personality created by religious conservatives and Islamists. The cults created for the sultans are kept alive by devout Muslims who oppose secular lifestyles and secularist ideas. Scholars have attributed a resurgence in Abdul Hamid's personality cult as an attempt to check Atatürk's established image as the founder of modern Turkey.

In recent years, there has been a growing cult of personality in Turkey around current President Recep Tayyip Erdoğan.

=== Turkmenistan ===
The rotating statue of Saparmurat Niyazov in Turkmenistan

Saparmurat Niyazov, who was President of Turkmenistan from 1985 to 2006, is another oft-cited cultivator of a cult of personality. Human Rights Watch, in its World Report 2012, said there was a cult of personality of then President Gurbanguly Berdimuhamedow. Agence France-Presse, a French international news agency, reported a developing personality cult. Reporters Without Borders said the president was promoting a cult of personality around himself and that his portraits had taken the place of those of the previous president.

=== United Kingdom ===
Beginning in October 2025, The New York Times editorial board published an Autocracy Index showing erosion of US democracy using various benchmarks, with "creating a cult of personality" being among the strongest indicators of autocratic drift under Donald Trump.

=== United States ===
A number of statesmen in American history have been noted by various historians as being supported by the effects of a cult of personality. Among the most reified figures in American historiography are the "Founding Fathers," a group which includes figures like George Washington, Thomas Jefferson, Benjamin Franklin, Paul Revere, and others.

Other American statesmen, mostly presidents, have also been described as having personality cults, including Andrew Jackson, Theodore Roosevelt, Franklin D. Roosevelt, Ronald Reagan, and Donald Trump. Conrad Black, who wrote several biographies of American presidents, argued that the "supreme champion of the American personality cult" has "deservedly" been Abraham Lincoln. John F. Kennedy's cult of personality largely came about after his assassination, although he and his wife Jackie Kennedy's appearance all contributed to the aura of "Camelot," which surrounded his administration.

Another American politician to whom a cult of personality has been ascribed is Huey Long, the populist Governor of Louisiana from 1928 to 1932, who continued to control the politics of the state as a United States senator until he was assassinated in 1935. The LaRouche movement has been considered to be a personality cult based upon Lyndon LaRouche. Critics of the Revolutionary Communist Party, USA have labeled it a personality cult centered around its leader, Bob Avakian.

=== Vietnam ===
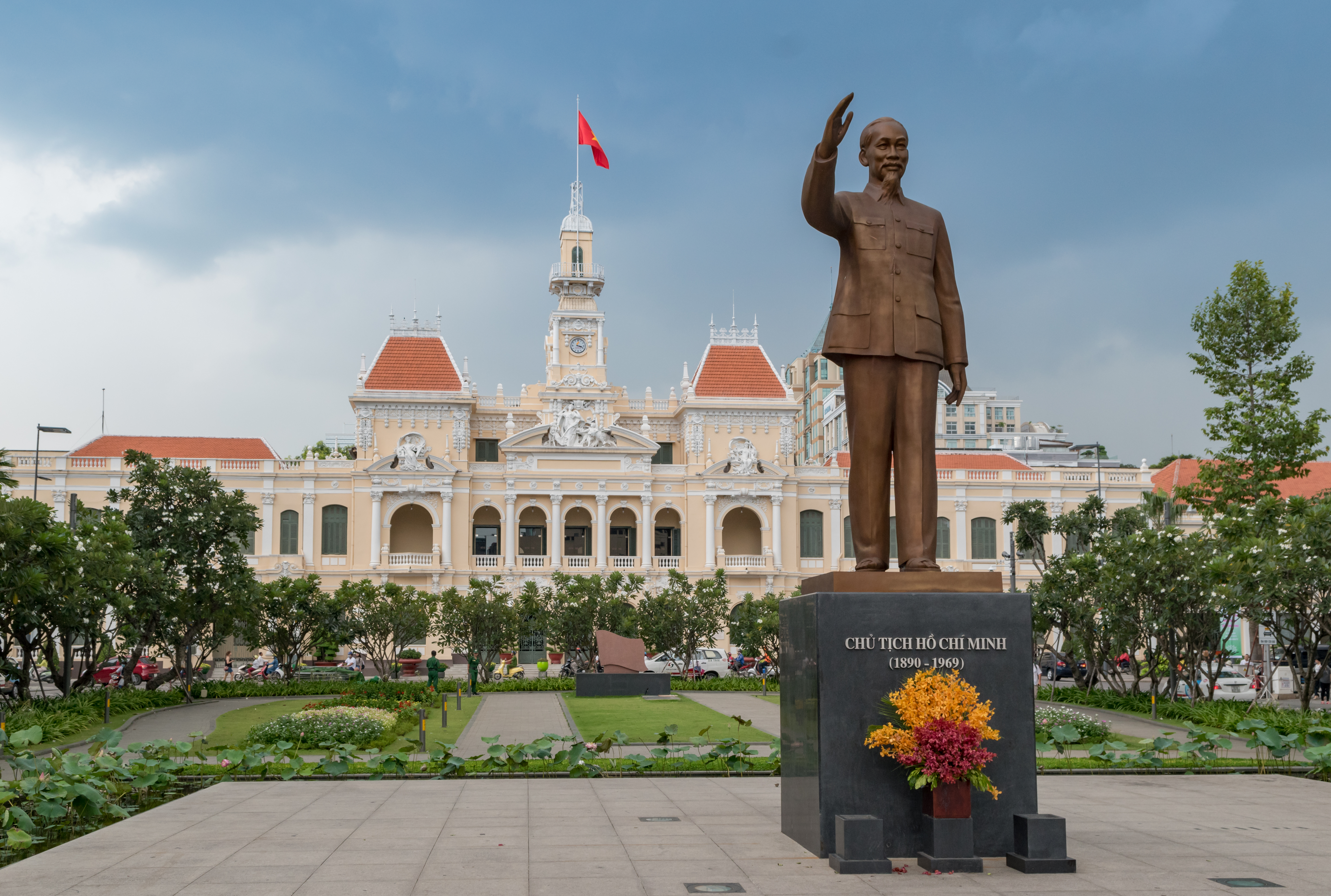
Ho Chi Minh statue in front of the City Hall of Ho Chi Minh City

The Vietnamese Communist Party regime has continually maintained a personality cult around Ho Chi Minh since the 1950s in North Vietnam, and it was later extended to South Vietnam after reunification, which it sees as a crucial part of its propaganda campaign surrounding Ho and the Party's past.

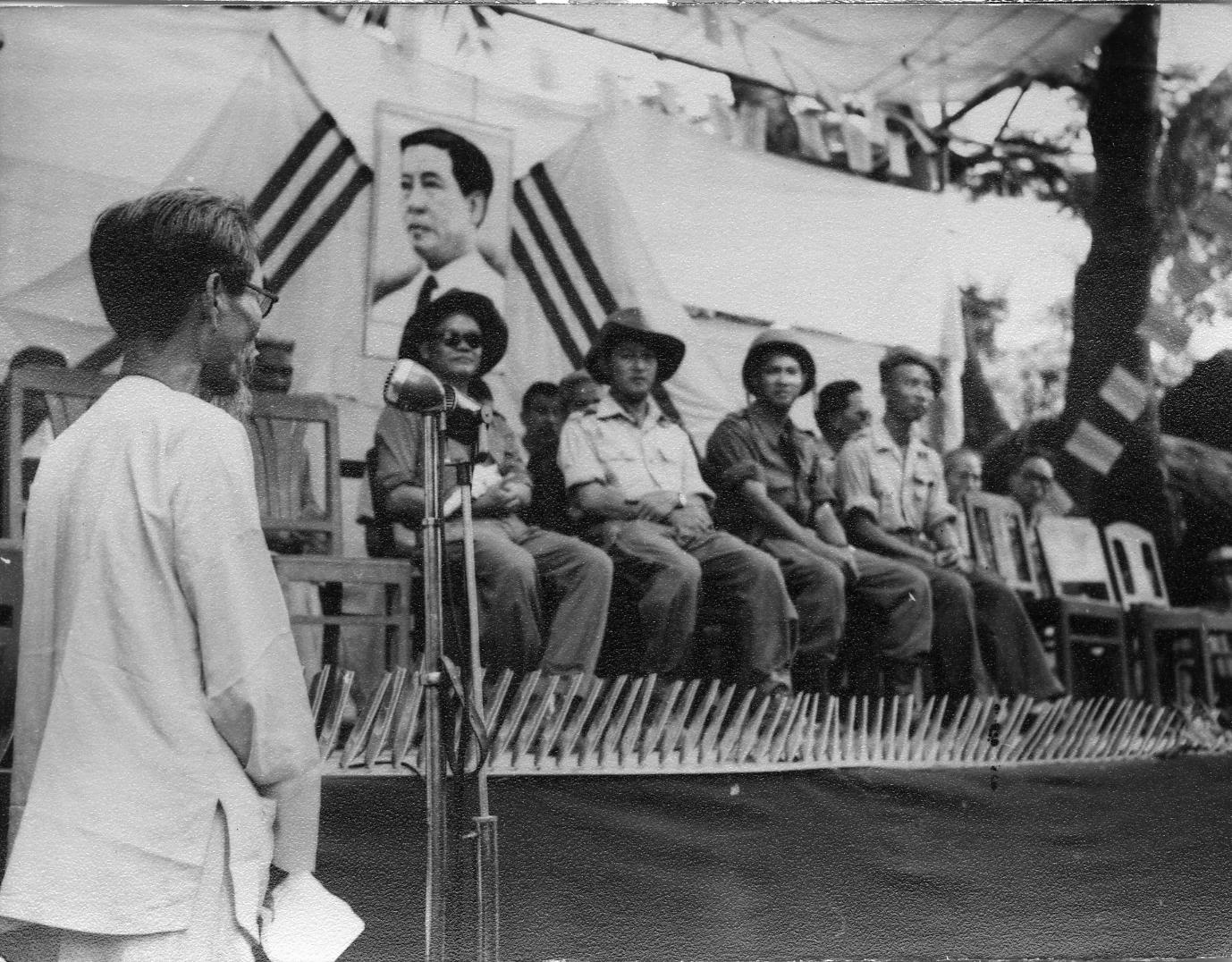
Portrait of President Ngo Dinh Diem during a pro-government demonstration in South Vietnam

The former capital of South Vietnam, Saigon, was officially renamed Ho Chi Minh City on May 1, 1975, one day after its capture, which officially ended the Vietnam War.

Throughout the existence of South Vietnam, its government sought to build a cult of personality around its head of state, Ngo Dinh Diem, with such institutions as National Revolutionary Movement and the Ministry of Information and Youth. The South Vietnamese regime promoted a national identity centered around the personality of Ngo Dinh Diem, his ideas, and his political doctrine, carried out indoctrination activities among the Vietnamese peasantry similar to the ones of Vichy France, and presented Ngo Dinh Diem as an "enlightened sovereign" who could improve the lot of all Vietnamese by creating "economic and social stability for all."

=== Yugoslavia ===
A cult of personality was created around Yugoslav President Josip Broz Tito, imitating that of the cult of Stalin. Homage included naming towns and cities after him, inscribing the name TITO on walls and mountain slopes, and planting memorial alleys.

== Business ==
Some senior commercial executives, following in the footsteps of the likes of heroes such as Henry Ford or Thomas J. Watson, have also become "omnipotent superstars" and the objects of cults of personality, including Elon Musk, Steve Jobs, Sam Altman, and Jeff Bezos.

== Entertainment ==
Outside of business and politics, numerous pop culture figures have been labeled as having a cult of personality through their fandoms that has been exacerbated through social media and online communities, with Taylor Swift and her fans (known as Swifties) being labeled as a prominent example in the 21st century.

== In popular culture ==
Cult of Personality is a 1988 song by Living Colour, and the group wrote it to emphasize how leaders can manipulate public opinion.

== See also ==
- Bread and circuses
- Charismatic authority
- Great man theory
- Imperial cult
- Secular religion
- List of cults of personality

== Bibliography ==
- Bosworth, Richard J. B. (2006). Mussolini's Italy: Life Under the Dictatorship, 1915–1945. Penguin Adult. ISBN 978-0141012919.
- Bosworth, Richard J. B. (2014). Mussolini. A&C Black. ISBN 978-1849660242.
- Brendon, Piers (2016). The Dark Valley. Random House. ISBN 978-1446496329.
- Falasca-Zamponi, Simonetta (2000). Fascist Spectacle: The Aesthetics of Power in Mussolini's Italy. University of California Press. ISBN 978-0520226777.
- Fenby, Jonathan (2005). Chiang Kai Shek: China's Generalissimo and the Nation He Lost. Carroll & Graf Publishers. ISBN 0-7867-1484-0. Archived from the original on November 9, 2023. Alt URL
- Gallo, Max (1973). Mussolini's Italy; Twenty Years of the Fascist Era. Macmillan.
- Gill, Graeme (1980). "The Soviet Leader Cult: Reflections on the Structure of Leadership in the Soviet Union". British Journal of Political Science. 10 (167): 167–186. doi:10.1017/S0007123400002088. S2CID 155049543.
- Gunther, John (1936). Inside Europe. Harper & brothers.
- Hamilton, Alastair (1973). Appeal of Fascism. Harper Mass Market Paperbacks. ISBN 978-0380010257.
- Kelly, Catriona (2005). "Riding the Magic Carpet: Children and Leader Cult in the Stalin Era". The Slavic and East European Journal. 49 (2): 199–224. doi:10.2307/20058260. JSTOR 20058260.
- Kershaw, Ian (1998). The 'Hitler Myth'. Image and Reality in the Third Reich.
- Kershaw, Ian (2001). Hitler 1936–1945: Nemesis. Penguin Books Limited. ISBN 978-0141925813.
- Pakula, Hannah (2009). The last empress: Madame Chiang Kai-Shek and the birth of modern China. Simon and Schuster. ISBN 978-1-4391-4893-8.
- Plamper, Jan (2012). The Stalin Cult: A Study in the Alchemy of Power. New Haven, Connecticut: Yale University Press. ISBN 978-0300169522.
- Speer, Albert (2009). Inside The Third Reich. Orion. ISBN 978-1842127353.
- Williams, Manuela (2006). Mussolini's Propaganda Abroad: Subversion in the Mediterranean and the Middle East, 1935–1940. Taylor & Francis. ISBN 978-0203004777.
