= History of emotions =

Field of research on human emotion through history

The history of emotions is a field of historical research concerned with human emotion, especially variations among cultures and historical periods in the experience and expression of emotions. Beginning in the 20th century with writers such as Lucien Febvre and Peter Gay, an expanding range of methodological approaches is being applied.

== Scope ==
In the last two decades,, the history of emotions, a derivative and revival of the history of experience, into an increasing productive and intellectually stimulating area of historical research. Although there are precursors of the history of emotions - especially Febvre's Histoire des Sensibilités or Gay's Psychohistory - the field converges methodologically with newer historiographical approaches such as conceptual history, historical constructivism and the history of the body.

Similar to the sociology of emotions or anthropology of emotions, the history of emotions is based on the assumption that not only the expression of feelings, but also the feelings themselves are learned. Culture and history are changing and so are feelings as well as their expression. The social relevance and potency of emotions is historically and culturally variable. In the view of many historians, emotion is, therefore, just as fundamental a category of history, as class, race or gender.

Journalist Gal Beckerman argues that historians such as Rob Boddice have become "interested in a deeper, more expansive concept that encompasses everything about how reality is perceived, melding together emotions and senses and much else into an engagement with 'experience.' ” In this regard, two decades of scholarship on the history of emotions have converged with parallel research on the history of the senses, violence, sexuality, bodily labor, and environments, reviving twentieth-century scholarship on the history of experience. This revival has also raised concerns previously voiced by a number of historians, such as the historiographical debates precipitated by Paul Cohen's History in Three Keys (1997), on siloing and tying a given study to a single category of analysis. A given analytical category in experiential history can further be an essentially contested concept.

== Methodology ==
A number of different methodological approaches have been discussed in recent years. Some historians of the emotions limit their research to the historical analysis of emotional norms and rules under the heading of emotionology. Particularly in the recent past, however, the methodological spectrum of the history of emotions has expanded to include performative, constructivist and practice theory approaches. Currently fundamental methodological concepts include: emotives, emotional habitus and emotional practice. Additionally there are several terms that describe the different scope and binding effect of feeling cultures such as emotional community, emotional regime, and emotional style. More recently, the history of emotions has engaged with recent social and cultural turns in the neurosciences, positing the history of emotions as a component part of a broader biocultural historicism. An increasing availability of retro-digitized historical source materials, along with technological and methodological developments in sentiment mining, has also impacted the history of emotions. Since the 2010s, various historical scholars have adjusted and developed computer-assisted methods to trace historical changes in the expression of emotions within large-scale bodies of digitized historical texts.

== Approaches to the History of Emotions ==
Modern research on the history of emotions has developed a range of frameworks to study how feelings are expressed, regulated and understood across various cultures and time periods. Researchers now use several concepts to explain how emotions are structured, including emotional communities (groups with shared norms of feelings), emotional regimes (dominant emotional norms enforced by institutions), emotional styles (characteristic patterns of feeling and expression in particular historical contexts) and emotional practices (everyday embodied behaviors through which emotions are produced and made to be meaningful).

Scholars in the field do debate certain topics and approaches, such as universalists vs. constructivist accounts of emotions, whether basic emotions are a human universal, or whether both the categories and experiences of emotion are deeply shared by culture, language and historical period. Another debate concerns how much attention historians should give to "named emotions" (emotion words) as opposed to unnamed affective experience, which might not be captured in language, but is evident in say body language.

=== William Reddy: emotives and emotional regimes ===
William M. Reddy's The Navigation of Feeling introduced a distinctive theoretical framework for writing the history of emotions drawing on cognitive psychology and anthropology to develop a theory that treats emotions as inseparable from thought and agency rather than as purely cultural constructs. Building on his concept of "emotives", modeled on J. L. Austin's performative utterances, Reddy argues that emotives actively shape and redirect emotional life rather than merely describing it, and that societies construct historically contingent "emotional regimes" that can be more or less strict in the constraints they impose. He links these regimes to political and social structures, proposing emotional liberty as a criterion for assessing the burden of emotional suffering individuals experience within different historical contexts.

== Bibliography ==
=== Introductions ===
- Rob Boddice, The History of Emotions, Manchester: Manchester University Press, 2018.
- Jan Plamper, Geschichte und Gefühl. Grundlagen der Emotionsgeschichte, Munich: Siedler, 2012.
- Barbara Rosenwein and Riccardo Cristiani, What is the History of Emotions? Cambridge: Polity, 2018.
- Richard Firth-Godbehere, A Human History of Emotions, London: 4th Estate, 2022.

=== Literature ===
- Rob Boddice, The History of Emotions: Past, Present, Future, in: Revista de Estudios Sociales, 62 (2017), pp. 10–15.
- Rob Boddice, The History of Emotions, in: New Directions in Social and Cultural History, ed. Sasha Handley, Rohan McWilliam, Lucy Noakes, London: Bloomsbury, 2018.
- Susan J. Matt, Current Emotion Research in History: Or, Doing History from the Inside Out, in: Emotion Review 3, 1 (2011), p. 117–124.
- Bettina Hitzer, Emotionsgeschichte - ein Anfang mit Folgen. Forschungsbericht.
- Anna Wierzbicka, The “History of Emotions” and the Future of Emotion Research, in: Emotion Review 2, 3 (2010), p. 269-273.
- Barbara Rosenwein, Problems and Methods in the History of Emotions.
- William M. Reddy, Historical Research on the Self and Emotions, in : Emotion Review 1, 4 (2009), p. 302-315.
- Florian Weber, Von der klassischen Affektenlehre zur Neurowissenschaft und zurück. Wege der Emotionsforschung in den Geistes- und Sozialwissenschaften, in: Neue Politische Literatur 53 (2008), p. 21-42.
- Daniela Saxer, Mit Gefühl handeln. Ansätze der Emotionsgeschichte.
- Alexandra Przyrembel, Sehnsucht nach Gefühlen. Zur Konjunktur der Emotionen in der Geschichtswissenschaft, in: L’homme 16 (2005), p. 116-124.
- Rüdiger Schnell, Historische Emotionsforschung. Eine mediävistische Standortbestimmung, in: Frühmittelalterliche Studien 38 (2004), p. 173-276.

=== Methodological discussions ===
- AHR Conversation: The Historical Study of Emotions.
- Frank Biess, Discussion Forum „History of Emotions“ (with Alon Confino, Ute Frevert, Uffa Jensen, Lyndal Roper, Daniela Saxer), in: German History 28 (2010), H. 1, p. 67-80.
- Maren Lorenz: Tiefe Wunden. Gewalterfahrung in den Kriegen der Frühen Neuzeit, in: Ulrich Bielefeld/Heinz Bude/Bernd Greiner (Hg.): Gesellschaft - Gewalt – Vertrauen. Jan Philipp Reemtsma zum 60. Geburtstag, Hamburger Edition: Hamburg 2012, S. 332–354.
- Jan Plamper, The History of Emotions: An Interview with William Reddy, Barbara Rosenwein, and Peter Stearns, in: History and Theory 49, no. 2 (2010): 237–265.

=== Research centres and organizations ===
- ACCESS The Amsterdam Centre for Cross-disciplinary Emotion and Sensory Studies
- ARC Centre of Excellence for the History of Emotions (1100-1800)
- Center for the History of Emotions, Max Planck-Institute for Human Development, Berlin
- NACHE The North American Chapter on the History of Emotion
- Queen Mary Centre for the History of Emotions, London
- Les Émotions au Moyen Age (EMMA)
- CHEP: An International Network for the Cultural History of Emotions in Premodernity
- The Emotions Project: The Social and Cultural Construction of Emotions: The Greek Paradigm, Oxford
- Historia cultural del concimiento. Discursos, prácticas, representaciones, Centro de Ciencias humanas y sociales, Madrid
- Cluster of Excellence "Languages of Emotion", FU Berlin
