= Jan Plamper =

German professor of history (1970–2023)

Jan Plamper FRHistS
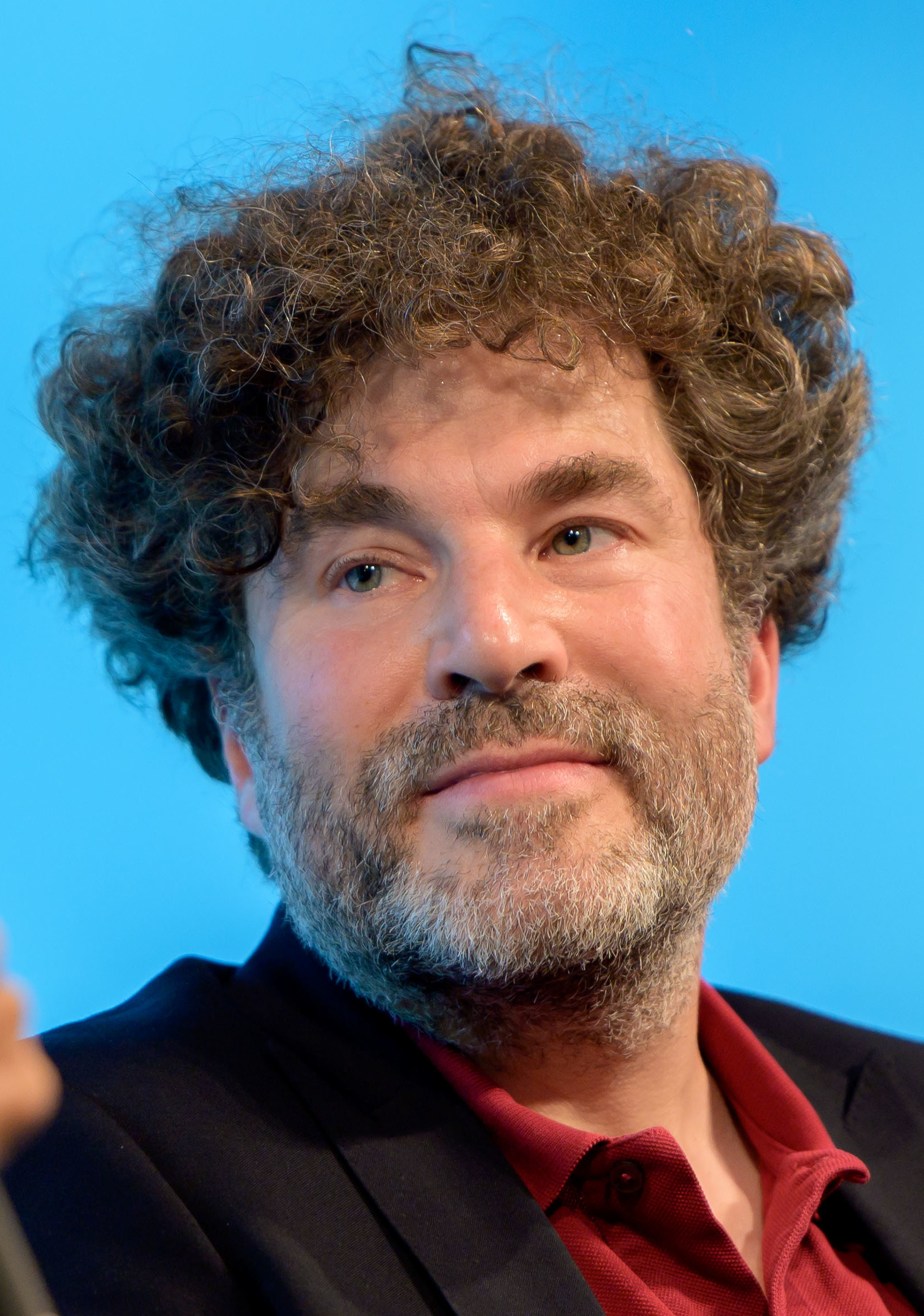
- Plamper at the launch of We Are All Migrants at the Heinrich Böll Foundation, 2019
- Born: 23 March 1970; Laichingen, West Germany
- Died: 30 November 2023 (aged 53); Berlin, Germany
- Occupation: Historian
- Title: Professor

Academic background
- Education: Brandeis University; University of California, Berkeley
- Thesis: The Stalin Cult: A Study in the Alchemy of Power (2001)
- Doctoral advisor: Yuri Slezkine

Academic work
- Discipline: History
- Sub-discipline: History of the 20th century; History of the 19th century
- Institutions: University of Tübingen; MPIB; Goldsmiths; Institute for Advanced Study; UL
- Main interests: History of emotions and the senses; History of migration; Russian History
- Notable works: The Stalin Cult: A Study in the Alchemy of Power; The History of Emotions: An Introduction
- Website: Jan Plamper publications on Academia.edu

Jan Plamper (23 March 1970 – 30 November 2023) was a German professor of history at the University of Limerick. His research interests included Russian history, the history of emotions, sensory history, and the history of migration. An obituary said of his work on emotions that he was 'a pioneer in this relatively new approach to studying the past'.

== Biography ==
=== Early life ===
Plamper was born in Laichingen in 1970 to Harald and Gudrun (née Damm) in what was then West Germany. He spent the majority of his childhood in Tübingen, alongside periods in Storrs, United States. His paternal grandfather was a Sudeten German from what had been the Austro-Hungarian town of Kaaden. In a 2017 interview with Kritika, Plamper revealed that he had been sexually assaulted at the age of 10 by his uncle.

=== Education ===
After obtaining a B.A. in history at Brandeis University in 1992, Plamper did social work for Memorial in St. Petersburg as a volunteer, in lieu of military service.

In 2001 he received his PhD in history at the University of California, Berkeley, with a dissertation under the supervision of Yuri Slezkine on Joseph Stalin's personality cult. He subsequently taught at Tübingen University and from 2008 to 2012 was a Dilthey Fellow of the Fritz Thyssen Foundation at Ute Frevert's Center for the History of Emotions, Max Planck Institute for Human Development, in Berlin. From 2012 to 2021 he was a professor of history at Goldsmiths, University of London, where he initiated the MA programmes in Black British and Queer history. Plamper held fellowships at Historisches Kolleg in Munich, Wissenschaftskolleg zu Berlin, Imre Kertész Kolleg Jena, and Alfried Krupp Wissenschaftskolleg Greifswald.

In his book We Are All Migrants, Plamper refuted several anti-immigrant narratives which led Jörg Baberowski to try to cancel Plamper as co-editor of the Forschungen zur Osteuropäischen Geschichte series.

=== Death ===
Plamper died of cancer on 30 November 2023, at the age of 53.

== Selected works ==
=== Monographs ===
- Das neue Wir. Warum Migration dazugehört: Eine andere Geschichte der Deutschen. S. Fischer, 2019, ISBN 978-3-10-397283-2, translated into English as We Are All Migrants: A Multicultural History of Germany. Cambridge University Press, 2023, ISBN 978-1-00-924229-5
- The History of Emotions: An Introduction. Oxford University Press, 2015, ISBN 978-0-19-966833-5.
- The Stalin Cult: A Study in the Alchemy of Power. Yale University Press, 2012, ISBN 978-0-300-16952-2.

=== Edited volumes and journal issues ===
- Nikolai Mikhailov, Jan Plamper (eds.), Malen’kii chelovek i bol’shaia voina v istorii Rossii, seredina XIX – seredina XX v. Nestor-Istoriia, 2014, ISBN 978-5-4469-0480-8.
- Jan Plamper, Benjamin Lazier (eds.), Fear: Across the Disciplines, University of Pittsburgh Press, 2012, ISBN 978-0-8229-6220-5.
- Jan Plamper, Benjamin Lazier (eds.), Fear Beyond the Disciplines, Representations, no. 110 (2010)
- Jan Plamper, Schamma Schahadat, Marc Elie (eds.), Rossiiskaia imperiia chuvstv: Podkhody k kul’turnoi istorii emotsii. NLO, 2010, ISBN 978-5-86793-785-0.
- Jan Plamper (ed.), Emotional Turn? Feelings in Russian History and Culture, Slavic Review 68, no. 2 (2009)
- Jan Plamper (ed.), Grenzgang in der Geschichte. Wissenschaftskulturen im internationalen Vergleich, Zeitschrift für Geschichtswissenschaft 52, no. 10 (2004)
- Klaus Heller, Jan Plamper (eds.), Personality Cults in Stalinism – Personenkulte im Stalinismus. V & R unipress, 2004, ISBN 3-89971-191-2.
